

330001–330100 

|-bgcolor=#E9E9E9
| 330001 ||  || — || October 1, 2005 || Catalina || CSS || HNS || align=right | 1.2 km || 
|-id=002 bgcolor=#E9E9E9
| 330002 ||  || — || October 7, 2005 || Kitt Peak || Spacewatch || — || align=right | 1.5 km || 
|-id=003 bgcolor=#E9E9E9
| 330003 ||  || — || October 7, 2005 || Kitt Peak || Spacewatch || — || align=right | 1.9 km || 
|-id=004 bgcolor=#E9E9E9
| 330004 ||  || — || October 6, 2005 || Kitt Peak || Spacewatch || — || align=right | 2.1 km || 
|-id=005 bgcolor=#E9E9E9
| 330005 ||  || — || October 8, 2005 || Kitt Peak || Spacewatch || — || align=right data-sort-value="0.96" | 960 m || 
|-id=006 bgcolor=#E9E9E9
| 330006 ||  || — || October 9, 2005 || Kitt Peak || Spacewatch || — || align=right | 1.6 km || 
|-id=007 bgcolor=#E9E9E9
| 330007 ||  || — || October 7, 2005 || Socorro || LINEAR || — || align=right | 2.3 km || 
|-id=008 bgcolor=#d6d6d6
| 330008 ||  || — || October 1, 2005 || Mount Lemmon || Mount Lemmon Survey || — || align=right | 1.6 km || 
|-id=009 bgcolor=#E9E9E9
| 330009 ||  || — || October 22, 2005 || Kitt Peak || Spacewatch || — || align=right | 1.6 km || 
|-id=010 bgcolor=#E9E9E9
| 330010 ||  || — || October 24, 2005 || Kitt Peak || Spacewatch || — || align=right data-sort-value="0.96" | 960 m || 
|-id=011 bgcolor=#E9E9E9
| 330011 ||  || — || October 21, 2005 || Pla D'Arguines || Pla D'Arguines Obs. || — || align=right | 1.1 km || 
|-id=012 bgcolor=#E9E9E9
| 330012 ||  || — || October 22, 2005 || Kitt Peak || Spacewatch || — || align=right data-sort-value="0.89" | 890 m || 
|-id=013 bgcolor=#E9E9E9
| 330013 ||  || — || October 23, 2005 || Catalina || CSS || — || align=right | 2.1 km || 
|-id=014 bgcolor=#E9E9E9
| 330014 ||  || — || October 25, 2005 || Catalina || CSS || — || align=right | 1.2 km || 
|-id=015 bgcolor=#E9E9E9
| 330015 ||  || — || October 23, 2005 || Palomar || NEAT || GER || align=right | 1.5 km || 
|-id=016 bgcolor=#E9E9E9
| 330016 ||  || — || October 25, 2005 || Catalina || CSS || EUN || align=right | 1.5 km || 
|-id=017 bgcolor=#E9E9E9
| 330017 ||  || — || October 22, 2005 || Kitt Peak || Spacewatch || — || align=right | 2.2 km || 
|-id=018 bgcolor=#E9E9E9
| 330018 ||  || — || October 22, 2005 || Kitt Peak || Spacewatch || — || align=right | 2.2 km || 
|-id=019 bgcolor=#E9E9E9
| 330019 ||  || — || October 22, 2005 || Kitt Peak || Spacewatch || — || align=right | 2.1 km || 
|-id=020 bgcolor=#E9E9E9
| 330020 ||  || — || October 22, 2005 || Kitt Peak || Spacewatch || — || align=right | 1.3 km || 
|-id=021 bgcolor=#E9E9E9
| 330021 ||  || — || October 22, 2005 || Kitt Peak || Spacewatch || — || align=right | 2.1 km || 
|-id=022 bgcolor=#E9E9E9
| 330022 ||  || — || October 22, 2005 || Kitt Peak || Spacewatch || MAR || align=right | 2.2 km || 
|-id=023 bgcolor=#E9E9E9
| 330023 ||  || — || October 23, 2005 || Catalina || CSS || MAR || align=right | 1.4 km || 
|-id=024 bgcolor=#E9E9E9
| 330024 ||  || — || October 24, 2005 || Kitt Peak || Spacewatch || — || align=right | 3.4 km || 
|-id=025 bgcolor=#E9E9E9
| 330025 ||  || — || October 24, 2005 || Kitt Peak || Spacewatch || — || align=right | 1.3 km || 
|-id=026 bgcolor=#E9E9E9
| 330026 ||  || — || October 24, 2005 || Kitt Peak || Spacewatch || — || align=right | 1.3 km || 
|-id=027 bgcolor=#E9E9E9
| 330027 ||  || — || October 25, 2005 || Catalina || CSS || — || align=right | 1.2 km || 
|-id=028 bgcolor=#E9E9E9
| 330028 ||  || — || October 28, 2005 || Bergisch Gladbach || W. Bickel || — || align=right | 1.9 km || 
|-id=029 bgcolor=#E9E9E9
| 330029 ||  || — || October 24, 2005 || Kitt Peak || Spacewatch || WIT || align=right data-sort-value="0.97" | 970 m || 
|-id=030 bgcolor=#E9E9E9
| 330030 ||  || — || October 24, 2005 || Kitt Peak || Spacewatch || — || align=right | 2.6 km || 
|-id=031 bgcolor=#E9E9E9
| 330031 ||  || — || October 27, 2005 || Mount Lemmon || Mount Lemmon Survey || MAR || align=right | 1.4 km || 
|-id=032 bgcolor=#E9E9E9
| 330032 ||  || — || October 22, 2005 || Kitt Peak || Spacewatch || — || align=right data-sort-value="0.85" | 850 m || 
|-id=033 bgcolor=#E9E9E9
| 330033 ||  || — || October 25, 2005 || Kitt Peak || Spacewatch || — || align=right | 1.4 km || 
|-id=034 bgcolor=#E9E9E9
| 330034 ||  || — || October 25, 2005 || Mount Lemmon || Mount Lemmon Survey || — || align=right | 3.0 km || 
|-id=035 bgcolor=#E9E9E9
| 330035 ||  || — || October 25, 2005 || Kitt Peak || Spacewatch || — || align=right | 1.4 km || 
|-id=036 bgcolor=#E9E9E9
| 330036 ||  || — || October 25, 2005 || Mount Lemmon || Mount Lemmon Survey || NEM || align=right | 3.1 km || 
|-id=037 bgcolor=#E9E9E9
| 330037 ||  || — || October 25, 2005 || Kitt Peak || Spacewatch || — || align=right | 1.4 km || 
|-id=038 bgcolor=#E9E9E9
| 330038 ||  || — || October 25, 2005 || Kitt Peak || Spacewatch || — || align=right | 2.2 km || 
|-id=039 bgcolor=#E9E9E9
| 330039 ||  || — || October 25, 2005 || Kitt Peak || Spacewatch || MAR || align=right | 1.2 km || 
|-id=040 bgcolor=#E9E9E9
| 330040 ||  || — || October 24, 2005 || Kitt Peak || Spacewatch || NEM || align=right | 2.8 km || 
|-id=041 bgcolor=#E9E9E9
| 330041 ||  || — || October 25, 2005 || Mount Lemmon || Mount Lemmon Survey || — || align=right | 1.2 km || 
|-id=042 bgcolor=#E9E9E9
| 330042 ||  || — || October 26, 2005 || Kitt Peak || Spacewatch || — || align=right | 1.6 km || 
|-id=043 bgcolor=#E9E9E9
| 330043 ||  || — || October 27, 2005 || Mount Lemmon || Mount Lemmon Survey || — || align=right | 1.00 km || 
|-id=044 bgcolor=#fefefe
| 330044 ||  || — || October 29, 2005 || Mount Lemmon || Mount Lemmon Survey || — || align=right | 1.2 km || 
|-id=045 bgcolor=#E9E9E9
| 330045 ||  || — || October 29, 2005 || Catalina || CSS || — || align=right | 1.7 km || 
|-id=046 bgcolor=#E9E9E9
| 330046 ||  || — || October 25, 2005 || Kitt Peak || Spacewatch || — || align=right | 1.8 km || 
|-id=047 bgcolor=#E9E9E9
| 330047 ||  || — || October 30, 2005 || Mount Lemmon || Mount Lemmon Survey || — || align=right | 1.7 km || 
|-id=048 bgcolor=#E9E9E9
| 330048 ||  || — || October 28, 2005 || Mount Lemmon || Mount Lemmon Survey || — || align=right | 1.3 km || 
|-id=049 bgcolor=#E9E9E9
| 330049 ||  || — || October 29, 2005 || Mount Lemmon || Mount Lemmon Survey || HEN || align=right data-sort-value="0.83" | 830 m || 
|-id=050 bgcolor=#d6d6d6
| 330050 ||  || — || October 25, 2005 || Catalina || CSS || — || align=right | 2.4 km || 
|-id=051 bgcolor=#E9E9E9
| 330051 ||  || — || October 27, 2005 || Kitt Peak || Spacewatch || — || align=right | 1.4 km || 
|-id=052 bgcolor=#E9E9E9
| 330052 ||  || — || October 27, 2005 || Kitt Peak || Spacewatch || — || align=right | 2.3 km || 
|-id=053 bgcolor=#E9E9E9
| 330053 ||  || — || October 27, 2005 || Kitt Peak || Spacewatch || HOF || align=right | 2.4 km || 
|-id=054 bgcolor=#E9E9E9
| 330054 ||  || — || October 27, 2005 || Kitt Peak || Spacewatch || — || align=right | 1.3 km || 
|-id=055 bgcolor=#E9E9E9
| 330055 ||  || — || October 26, 2005 || Kitt Peak || Spacewatch || — || align=right | 1.5 km || 
|-id=056 bgcolor=#E9E9E9
| 330056 ||  || — || October 28, 2005 || Uccle || E. W. Elst, H. Debehogne || — || align=right data-sort-value="0.96" | 960 m || 
|-id=057 bgcolor=#E9E9E9
| 330057 ||  || — || October 7, 2005 || Catalina || CSS || — || align=right | 1.5 km || 
|-id=058 bgcolor=#E9E9E9
| 330058 ||  || — || October 30, 2005 || Palomar || NEAT || — || align=right | 1.4 km || 
|-id=059 bgcolor=#E9E9E9
| 330059 ||  || — || October 28, 2005 || Mount Lemmon || Mount Lemmon Survey || — || align=right | 1.6 km || 
|-id=060 bgcolor=#fefefe
| 330060 ||  || — || October 24, 2005 || Palomar || NEAT || — || align=right | 1.4 km || 
|-id=061 bgcolor=#E9E9E9
| 330061 ||  || — || October 22, 2005 || Apache Point || A. C. Becker || — || align=right | 1.7 km || 
|-id=062 bgcolor=#E9E9E9
| 330062 ||  || — || October 27, 2005 || Anderson Mesa || LONEOS || — || align=right | 2.0 km || 
|-id=063 bgcolor=#fefefe
| 330063 ||  || — || November 3, 2005 || Socorro || LINEAR || H || align=right | 1.00 km || 
|-id=064 bgcolor=#E9E9E9
| 330064 ||  || — || November 4, 2005 || Socorro || LINEAR || BAR || align=right | 1.5 km || 
|-id=065 bgcolor=#E9E9E9
| 330065 ||  || — || November 10, 2005 || Gnosca || S. Sposetti || — || align=right | 1.7 km || 
|-id=066 bgcolor=#E9E9E9
| 330066 ||  || — || November 2, 2005 || Mount Lemmon || Mount Lemmon Survey || — || align=right | 1.0 km || 
|-id=067 bgcolor=#E9E9E9
| 330067 ||  || — || November 4, 2005 || Kitt Peak || Spacewatch || — || align=right | 2.5 km || 
|-id=068 bgcolor=#E9E9E9
| 330068 ||  || — || November 3, 2005 || Mount Lemmon || Mount Lemmon Survey || — || align=right data-sort-value="0.92" | 920 m || 
|-id=069 bgcolor=#E9E9E9
| 330069 ||  || — || November 4, 2005 || Socorro || LINEAR || — || align=right | 1.2 km || 
|-id=070 bgcolor=#E9E9E9
| 330070 ||  || — || November 4, 2005 || Kitt Peak || Spacewatch || — || align=right | 1.7 km || 
|-id=071 bgcolor=#E9E9E9
| 330071 ||  || — || November 1, 2005 || Mount Lemmon || Mount Lemmon Survey || INO || align=right | 1.6 km || 
|-id=072 bgcolor=#E9E9E9
| 330072 ||  || — || November 1, 2005 || Kitt Peak || Spacewatch || — || align=right | 1.7 km || 
|-id=073 bgcolor=#E9E9E9
| 330073 ||  || — || November 4, 2005 || Kitt Peak || Spacewatch || — || align=right | 2.0 km || 
|-id=074 bgcolor=#E9E9E9
| 330074 ||  || — || November 6, 2005 || Kitt Peak || Spacewatch || NEM || align=right | 2.5 km || 
|-id=075 bgcolor=#E9E9E9
| 330075 ||  || — || November 6, 2005 || Mount Lemmon || Mount Lemmon Survey || — || align=right | 1.1 km || 
|-id=076 bgcolor=#E9E9E9
| 330076 ||  || — || November 6, 2005 || Mount Lemmon || Mount Lemmon Survey || NEM || align=right | 2.6 km || 
|-id=077 bgcolor=#E9E9E9
| 330077 ||  || — || November 4, 2005 || Kitt Peak || Spacewatch || — || align=right | 1.7 km || 
|-id=078 bgcolor=#E9E9E9
| 330078 ||  || — || November 12, 2005 || Kitt Peak || Spacewatch || — || align=right | 1.4 km || 
|-id=079 bgcolor=#E9E9E9
| 330079 ||  || — || November 20, 2005 || Palomar || NEAT || — || align=right | 3.0 km || 
|-id=080 bgcolor=#d6d6d6
| 330080 ||  || — || November 21, 2005 || Kitt Peak || Spacewatch || KAR || align=right | 1.0 km || 
|-id=081 bgcolor=#E9E9E9
| 330081 ||  || — || November 22, 2005 || Kitt Peak || Spacewatch || WIT || align=right | 1.3 km || 
|-id=082 bgcolor=#fefefe
| 330082 ||  || — || November 25, 2005 || Mount Lemmon || Mount Lemmon Survey || H || align=right data-sort-value="0.46" | 460 m || 
|-id=083 bgcolor=#fefefe
| 330083 ||  || — || November 30, 2005 || Mayhill || iTelescope Obs. || H || align=right data-sort-value="0.98" | 980 m || 
|-id=084 bgcolor=#E9E9E9
| 330084 ||  || — || November 26, 2005 || Kitt Peak || Spacewatch || — || align=right | 1.5 km || 
|-id=085 bgcolor=#E9E9E9
| 330085 ||  || — || November 25, 2005 || Kitt Peak || Spacewatch || — || align=right | 1.1 km || 
|-id=086 bgcolor=#E9E9E9
| 330086 ||  || — || November 26, 2005 || Mount Lemmon || Mount Lemmon Survey || — || align=right | 2.4 km || 
|-id=087 bgcolor=#E9E9E9
| 330087 ||  || — || November 26, 2005 || Mount Lemmon || Mount Lemmon Survey || WIT || align=right | 1.3 km || 
|-id=088 bgcolor=#E9E9E9
| 330088 ||  || — || November 28, 2005 || Socorro || LINEAR || JUN || align=right | 1.1 km || 
|-id=089 bgcolor=#E9E9E9
| 330089 ||  || — || November 28, 2005 || Catalina || CSS || — || align=right | 1.5 km || 
|-id=090 bgcolor=#E9E9E9
| 330090 ||  || — || October 25, 2005 || Mount Lemmon || Mount Lemmon Survey || — || align=right | 2.0 km || 
|-id=091 bgcolor=#E9E9E9
| 330091 ||  || — || November 25, 2005 || Mount Lemmon || Mount Lemmon Survey || — || align=right | 1.2 km || 
|-id=092 bgcolor=#E9E9E9
| 330092 ||  || — || November 25, 2005 || Mount Lemmon || Mount Lemmon Survey || KRM || align=right | 3.2 km || 
|-id=093 bgcolor=#E9E9E9
| 330093 ||  || — || November 26, 2005 || Catalina || CSS || MAR || align=right | 1.3 km || 
|-id=094 bgcolor=#E9E9E9
| 330094 ||  || — || November 29, 2005 || Mount Lemmon || Mount Lemmon Survey || — || align=right | 1.6 km || 
|-id=095 bgcolor=#E9E9E9
| 330095 ||  || — || November 29, 2005 || Mount Lemmon || Mount Lemmon Survey || HOF || align=right | 3.3 km || 
|-id=096 bgcolor=#d6d6d6
| 330096 ||  || — || November 26, 2005 || Mount Lemmon || Mount Lemmon Survey || — || align=right | 2.3 km || 
|-id=097 bgcolor=#E9E9E9
| 330097 ||  || — || November 30, 2005 || Socorro || LINEAR || EUN || align=right | 2.0 km || 
|-id=098 bgcolor=#E9E9E9
| 330098 ||  || — || October 1, 2005 || Mount Lemmon || Mount Lemmon Survey || — || align=right | 1.5 km || 
|-id=099 bgcolor=#E9E9E9
| 330099 ||  || — || November 24, 2005 || Palomar || NEAT || JUN || align=right | 1.00 km || 
|-id=100 bgcolor=#d6d6d6
| 330100 ||  || — || November 25, 2005 || Mount Lemmon || Mount Lemmon Survey || — || align=right | 2.4 km || 
|}

330101–330200 

|-bgcolor=#E9E9E9
| 330101 ||  || — || November 30, 2005 || Kitt Peak || Spacewatch || — || align=right | 2.2 km || 
|-id=102 bgcolor=#E9E9E9
| 330102 ||  || — || December 20, 2001 || Apache Point || SDSS || HNS || align=right | 1.4 km || 
|-id=103 bgcolor=#E9E9E9
| 330103 ||  || — || November 30, 2005 || Socorro || LINEAR || — || align=right | 2.5 km || 
|-id=104 bgcolor=#d6d6d6
| 330104 ||  || — || November 30, 2005 || Socorro || LINEAR || — || align=right | 2.6 km || 
|-id=105 bgcolor=#E9E9E9
| 330105 ||  || — || November 30, 2005 || Anderson Mesa || LONEOS || — || align=right | 1.5 km || 
|-id=106 bgcolor=#E9E9E9
| 330106 ||  || — || November 30, 2005 || Kitt Peak || Spacewatch || NEM || align=right | 2.8 km || 
|-id=107 bgcolor=#E9E9E9
| 330107 || 2005 XT || — || December 2, 2005 || Mayhill || A. Lowe || RAF || align=right | 1.6 km || 
|-id=108 bgcolor=#E9E9E9
| 330108 ||  || — || December 2, 2005 || Mount Lemmon || Mount Lemmon Survey || — || align=right | 1.7 km || 
|-id=109 bgcolor=#E9E9E9
| 330109 ||  || — || November 1, 2005 || Mount Lemmon || Mount Lemmon Survey || — || align=right | 2.7 km || 
|-id=110 bgcolor=#fefefe
| 330110 ||  || — || December 7, 2005 || Catalina || CSS || H || align=right data-sort-value="0.82" | 820 m || 
|-id=111 bgcolor=#E9E9E9
| 330111 ||  || — || December 1, 2005 || Mount Lemmon || Mount Lemmon Survey || — || align=right | 1.4 km || 
|-id=112 bgcolor=#E9E9E9
| 330112 ||  || — || December 4, 2005 || Kitt Peak || Spacewatch || — || align=right | 1.6 km || 
|-id=113 bgcolor=#E9E9E9
| 330113 ||  || — || December 6, 2005 || Kitt Peak || Spacewatch || MAR || align=right | 1.0 km || 
|-id=114 bgcolor=#E9E9E9
| 330114 ||  || — || December 5, 2005 || Kitt Peak || Spacewatch || — || align=right | 1.8 km || 
|-id=115 bgcolor=#E9E9E9
| 330115 ||  || — || December 5, 2005 || Mount Lemmon || Mount Lemmon Survey || VIB || align=right | 1.8 km || 
|-id=116 bgcolor=#fefefe
| 330116 ||  || — || December 7, 2005 || Socorro || LINEAR || H || align=right data-sort-value="0.79" | 790 m || 
|-id=117 bgcolor=#d6d6d6
| 330117 ||  || — || December 3, 2005 || Mauna Kea || A. Boattini || HYG || align=right | 2.4 km || 
|-id=118 bgcolor=#E9E9E9
| 330118 ||  || — || December 2, 2005 || Kitt Peak || M. W. Buie || AST || align=right | 1.4 km || 
|-id=119 bgcolor=#E9E9E9
| 330119 || 2005 YL || — || December 20, 2005 || Calvin-Rehoboth || Calvin–Rehoboth Obs. || — || align=right | 2.5 km || 
|-id=120 bgcolor=#E9E9E9
| 330120 ||  || — || December 24, 2005 || Kitt Peak || Spacewatch || HEN || align=right | 1.3 km || 
|-id=121 bgcolor=#E9E9E9
| 330121 ||  || — || December 24, 2005 || Kitt Peak || Spacewatch || GEF || align=right | 1.7 km || 
|-id=122 bgcolor=#E9E9E9
| 330122 ||  || — || December 24, 2005 || Kitt Peak || Spacewatch || — || align=right | 2.1 km || 
|-id=123 bgcolor=#d6d6d6
| 330123 ||  || — || December 25, 2005 || Kitt Peak || Spacewatch || CHA || align=right | 1.9 km || 
|-id=124 bgcolor=#E9E9E9
| 330124 ||  || — || December 25, 2005 || Kitt Peak || Spacewatch || AGN || align=right | 1.4 km || 
|-id=125 bgcolor=#E9E9E9
| 330125 ||  || — || December 22, 2005 || Kitt Peak || Spacewatch || AGN || align=right | 1.4 km || 
|-id=126 bgcolor=#E9E9E9
| 330126 ||  || — || December 24, 2005 || Kitt Peak || Spacewatch || AGN || align=right | 1.2 km || 
|-id=127 bgcolor=#d6d6d6
| 330127 ||  || — || December 5, 2005 || Kitt Peak || Spacewatch || BRA || align=right | 1.6 km || 
|-id=128 bgcolor=#E9E9E9
| 330128 ||  || — || December 24, 2005 || Kitt Peak || Spacewatch || — || align=right | 1.4 km || 
|-id=129 bgcolor=#E9E9E9
| 330129 ||  || — || December 24, 2005 || Kitt Peak || Spacewatch || — || align=right | 3.4 km || 
|-id=130 bgcolor=#d6d6d6
| 330130 ||  || — || December 25, 2005 || Kitt Peak || Spacewatch || — || align=right | 4.2 km || 
|-id=131 bgcolor=#d6d6d6
| 330131 ||  || — || December 25, 2005 || Kitt Peak || Spacewatch || — || align=right | 4.3 km || 
|-id=132 bgcolor=#E9E9E9
| 330132 ||  || — || December 25, 2005 || Kitt Peak || Spacewatch || — || align=right | 1.5 km || 
|-id=133 bgcolor=#E9E9E9
| 330133 ||  || — || December 25, 2005 || Kitt Peak || Spacewatch || AGN || align=right | 1.5 km || 
|-id=134 bgcolor=#E9E9E9
| 330134 ||  || — || December 26, 2005 || Kitt Peak || Spacewatch || HOF || align=right | 2.5 km || 
|-id=135 bgcolor=#E9E9E9
| 330135 ||  || — || December 26, 2005 || Kitt Peak || Spacewatch || — || align=right | 2.1 km || 
|-id=136 bgcolor=#d6d6d6
| 330136 ||  || — || December 28, 2005 || Mount Lemmon || Mount Lemmon Survey || KOR || align=right | 1.4 km || 
|-id=137 bgcolor=#E9E9E9
| 330137 ||  || — || December 26, 2005 || Kitt Peak || Spacewatch || HOF || align=right | 3.4 km || 
|-id=138 bgcolor=#fefefe
| 330138 ||  || — || July 7, 2002 || Palomar || NEAT || H || align=right data-sort-value="0.75" | 750 m || 
|-id=139 bgcolor=#E9E9E9
| 330139 ||  || — || December 28, 2005 || Mount Lemmon || Mount Lemmon Survey || NEM || align=right | 2.5 km || 
|-id=140 bgcolor=#E9E9E9
| 330140 ||  || — || December 28, 2005 || Mount Lemmon || Mount Lemmon Survey || AGN || align=right | 1.3 km || 
|-id=141 bgcolor=#E9E9E9
| 330141 ||  || — || December 26, 2005 || Kitt Peak || Spacewatch || — || align=right | 3.6 km || 
|-id=142 bgcolor=#E9E9E9
| 330142 ||  || — || December 30, 2005 || Kitt Peak || Spacewatch || — || align=right | 3.5 km || 
|-id=143 bgcolor=#d6d6d6
| 330143 ||  || — || December 27, 2005 || Kitt Peak || Spacewatch || BRA || align=right | 1.7 km || 
|-id=144 bgcolor=#d6d6d6
| 330144 ||  || — || January 4, 2006 || Socorro || LINEAR || — || align=right | 3.6 km || 
|-id=145 bgcolor=#E9E9E9
| 330145 ||  || — || January 2, 2006 || Mount Lemmon || Mount Lemmon Survey || AGN || align=right | 1.3 km || 
|-id=146 bgcolor=#E9E9E9
| 330146 ||  || — || January 5, 2006 || Kitt Peak || Spacewatch || — || align=right | 2.1 km || 
|-id=147 bgcolor=#E9E9E9
| 330147 ||  || — || January 7, 2006 || Mount Lemmon || Mount Lemmon Survey || WIT || align=right | 1.4 km || 
|-id=148 bgcolor=#E9E9E9
| 330148 ||  || — || January 6, 2006 || Kitt Peak || Spacewatch || GEF || align=right | 1.8 km || 
|-id=149 bgcolor=#d6d6d6
| 330149 ||  || — || January 6, 2006 || Kitt Peak || Spacewatch || — || align=right | 2.5 km || 
|-id=150 bgcolor=#d6d6d6
| 330150 ||  || — || January 4, 2006 || Mount Lemmon || Mount Lemmon Survey || — || align=right | 5.3 km || 
|-id=151 bgcolor=#d6d6d6
| 330151 ||  || — || January 21, 2006 || Kitt Peak || Spacewatch || — || align=right | 4.1 km || 
|-id=152 bgcolor=#E9E9E9
| 330152 ||  || — || January 22, 2006 || Mount Lemmon || Mount Lemmon Survey || GEF || align=right | 1.6 km || 
|-id=153 bgcolor=#d6d6d6
| 330153 ||  || — || January 23, 2006 || Nyukasa || Mount Nyukasa Stn. || KOR || align=right | 1.4 km || 
|-id=154 bgcolor=#d6d6d6
| 330154 ||  || — || January 22, 2006 || Mount Lemmon || Mount Lemmon Survey || KOR || align=right | 1.3 km || 
|-id=155 bgcolor=#d6d6d6
| 330155 ||  || — || January 23, 2006 || Kitt Peak || Spacewatch || KOR || align=right | 1.3 km || 
|-id=156 bgcolor=#d6d6d6
| 330156 ||  || — || January 23, 2006 || Mount Lemmon || Mount Lemmon Survey || — || align=right | 2.6 km || 
|-id=157 bgcolor=#d6d6d6
| 330157 ||  || — || January 25, 2006 || Kitt Peak || Spacewatch || — || align=right | 3.1 km || 
|-id=158 bgcolor=#d6d6d6
| 330158 ||  || — || January 25, 2006 || Anderson Mesa || LONEOS || — || align=right | 3.7 km || 
|-id=159 bgcolor=#E9E9E9
| 330159 ||  || — || January 25, 2006 || Kitt Peak || Spacewatch || — || align=right | 3.7 km || 
|-id=160 bgcolor=#d6d6d6
| 330160 ||  || — || January 23, 2006 || Catalina || CSS || TIR || align=right | 3.3 km || 
|-id=161 bgcolor=#d6d6d6
| 330161 ||  || — || January 26, 2006 || Kitt Peak || Spacewatch || — || align=right | 3.2 km || 
|-id=162 bgcolor=#E9E9E9
| 330162 ||  || — || January 26, 2006 || Mount Lemmon || Mount Lemmon Survey || — || align=right | 2.2 km || 
|-id=163 bgcolor=#d6d6d6
| 330163 ||  || — || January 29, 2006 || Kitt Peak || Spacewatch || — || align=right | 2.6 km || 
|-id=164 bgcolor=#E9E9E9
| 330164 ||  || — || January 25, 2006 || Kitt Peak || Spacewatch || AGN || align=right | 1.7 km || 
|-id=165 bgcolor=#d6d6d6
| 330165 ||  || — || January 8, 2006 || Kitt Peak || Spacewatch || EOS || align=right | 2.4 km || 
|-id=166 bgcolor=#d6d6d6
| 330166 ||  || — || January 31, 2006 || 7300 Observatory || W. K. Y. Yeung || — || align=right | 2.7 km || 
|-id=167 bgcolor=#d6d6d6
| 330167 ||  || — || January 25, 2006 || Kitt Peak || Spacewatch || — || align=right | 3.2 km || 
|-id=168 bgcolor=#d6d6d6
| 330168 ||  || — || January 31, 2006 || Kitt Peak || Spacewatch || — || align=right | 3.1 km || 
|-id=169 bgcolor=#d6d6d6
| 330169 ||  || — || January 31, 2006 || Mount Lemmon || Mount Lemmon Survey || CHA || align=right | 2.3 km || 
|-id=170 bgcolor=#d6d6d6
| 330170 ||  || — || January 31, 2006 || Kitt Peak || Spacewatch || — || align=right | 2.5 km || 
|-id=171 bgcolor=#d6d6d6
| 330171 ||  || — || January 31, 2006 || Kitt Peak || Spacewatch || — || align=right | 2.5 km || 
|-id=172 bgcolor=#E9E9E9
| 330172 ||  || — || January 30, 2006 || Kitt Peak || Spacewatch || — || align=right | 2.1 km || 
|-id=173 bgcolor=#d6d6d6
| 330173 ||  || — || January 31, 2006 || Kitt Peak || Spacewatch || — || align=right | 2.8 km || 
|-id=174 bgcolor=#E9E9E9
| 330174 ||  || — || February 1, 2006 || Mount Lemmon || Mount Lemmon Survey || — || align=right | 2.6 km || 
|-id=175 bgcolor=#d6d6d6
| 330175 ||  || — || February 1, 2006 || Kitt Peak || Spacewatch || — || align=right | 4.0 km || 
|-id=176 bgcolor=#d6d6d6
| 330176 ||  || — || January 21, 2006 || Kitt Peak || Spacewatch || EOS || align=right | 2.4 km || 
|-id=177 bgcolor=#d6d6d6
| 330177 ||  || — || February 2, 2006 || Mount Lemmon || Mount Lemmon Survey || — || align=right | 2.7 km || 
|-id=178 bgcolor=#d6d6d6
| 330178 ||  || — || February 20, 2006 || Catalina || CSS || — || align=right | 3.6 km || 
|-id=179 bgcolor=#d6d6d6
| 330179 ||  || — || February 20, 2006 || Kitt Peak || Spacewatch || — || align=right | 3.1 km || 
|-id=180 bgcolor=#d6d6d6
| 330180 ||  || — || February 20, 2006 || Kitt Peak || Spacewatch || — || align=right | 2.1 km || 
|-id=181 bgcolor=#d6d6d6
| 330181 ||  || — || February 21, 2006 || Mount Lemmon || Mount Lemmon Survey || — || align=right | 2.6 km || 
|-id=182 bgcolor=#d6d6d6
| 330182 ||  || — || February 24, 2006 || Kitt Peak || Spacewatch || KOR || align=right | 1.5 km || 
|-id=183 bgcolor=#d6d6d6
| 330183 ||  || — || February 24, 2006 || Kitt Peak || Spacewatch || — || align=right | 2.9 km || 
|-id=184 bgcolor=#d6d6d6
| 330184 ||  || — || February 24, 2006 || Mount Lemmon || Mount Lemmon Survey || — || align=right | 3.6 km || 
|-id=185 bgcolor=#d6d6d6
| 330185 ||  || — || January 31, 2006 || Kitt Peak || Spacewatch || — || align=right | 2.8 km || 
|-id=186 bgcolor=#d6d6d6
| 330186 ||  || — || January 31, 2006 || Kitt Peak || Spacewatch || — || align=right | 2.5 km || 
|-id=187 bgcolor=#d6d6d6
| 330187 ||  || — || February 24, 2006 || Kitt Peak || Spacewatch || — || align=right | 2.7 km || 
|-id=188 bgcolor=#d6d6d6
| 330188 ||  || — || January 31, 2006 || Kitt Peak || Spacewatch || — || align=right | 2.9 km || 
|-id=189 bgcolor=#d6d6d6
| 330189 ||  || — || February 24, 2006 || Kitt Peak || Spacewatch || — || align=right | 2.7 km || 
|-id=190 bgcolor=#d6d6d6
| 330190 ||  || — || February 24, 2006 || Kitt Peak || Spacewatch || — || align=right | 2.3 km || 
|-id=191 bgcolor=#d6d6d6
| 330191 ||  || — || February 24, 2006 || Kitt Peak || Spacewatch || — || align=right | 3.2 km || 
|-id=192 bgcolor=#d6d6d6
| 330192 ||  || — || February 24, 2006 || Kitt Peak || Spacewatch || — || align=right | 3.3 km || 
|-id=193 bgcolor=#d6d6d6
| 330193 ||  || — || January 7, 2006 || Mount Lemmon || Mount Lemmon Survey || — || align=right | 3.6 km || 
|-id=194 bgcolor=#d6d6d6
| 330194 ||  || — || February 24, 2006 || Kitt Peak || Spacewatch || EOS || align=right | 1.7 km || 
|-id=195 bgcolor=#d6d6d6
| 330195 ||  || — || February 27, 2006 || Kitt Peak || Spacewatch || HYG || align=right | 4.0 km || 
|-id=196 bgcolor=#d6d6d6
| 330196 ||  || — || February 27, 2006 || Kitt Peak || Spacewatch || — || align=right | 2.9 km || 
|-id=197 bgcolor=#d6d6d6
| 330197 ||  || — || February 27, 2006 || Kitt Peak || Spacewatch || — || align=right | 2.6 km || 
|-id=198 bgcolor=#d6d6d6
| 330198 ||  || — || March 2, 2006 || Kitt Peak || Spacewatch || — || align=right | 2.8 km || 
|-id=199 bgcolor=#d6d6d6
| 330199 ||  || — || March 2, 2006 || Kitt Peak || Spacewatch || — || align=right | 3.6 km || 
|-id=200 bgcolor=#d6d6d6
| 330200 ||  || — || February 25, 2006 || Anderson Mesa || LONEOS || TIR || align=right | 3.8 km || 
|}

330201–330300 

|-bgcolor=#d6d6d6
| 330201 ||  || — || February 25, 2006 || Kitt Peak || Spacewatch || — || align=right | 2.4 km || 
|-id=202 bgcolor=#d6d6d6
| 330202 ||  || — || March 23, 2006 || Kitt Peak || Spacewatch || URS || align=right | 4.6 km || 
|-id=203 bgcolor=#d6d6d6
| 330203 ||  || — || March 23, 2006 || Kitt Peak || Spacewatch || — || align=right | 2.9 km || 
|-id=204 bgcolor=#d6d6d6
| 330204 ||  || — || March 23, 2006 || Mount Lemmon || Mount Lemmon Survey || HYG || align=right | 2.9 km || 
|-id=205 bgcolor=#d6d6d6
| 330205 ||  || — || March 23, 2006 || Catalina || CSS || — || align=right | 4.0 km || 
|-id=206 bgcolor=#d6d6d6
| 330206 ||  || — || March 23, 2006 || Kitt Peak || Spacewatch || — || align=right | 3.9 km || 
|-id=207 bgcolor=#d6d6d6
| 330207 ||  || — || September 26, 2003 || Apache Point || SDSS || — || align=right | 2.6 km || 
|-id=208 bgcolor=#d6d6d6
| 330208 ||  || — || March 23, 2006 || Catalina || CSS || — || align=right | 4.1 km || 
|-id=209 bgcolor=#d6d6d6
| 330209 ||  || — || March 24, 2006 || Anderson Mesa || LONEOS || — || align=right | 3.2 km || 
|-id=210 bgcolor=#d6d6d6
| 330210 ||  || — || March 26, 2006 || Catalina || CSS || EUP || align=right | 4.2 km || 
|-id=211 bgcolor=#d6d6d6
| 330211 ||  || — || April 2, 2006 || Kitt Peak || Spacewatch || — || align=right | 3.8 km || 
|-id=212 bgcolor=#d6d6d6
| 330212 ||  || — || April 2, 2006 || Kitt Peak || Spacewatch || — || align=right | 3.1 km || 
|-id=213 bgcolor=#d6d6d6
| 330213 ||  || — || April 2, 2006 || Kitt Peak || Spacewatch || — || align=right | 2.7 km || 
|-id=214 bgcolor=#d6d6d6
| 330214 ||  || — || April 2, 2006 || Kitt Peak || Spacewatch || — || align=right | 3.1 km || 
|-id=215 bgcolor=#d6d6d6
| 330215 ||  || — || April 8, 2006 || Mount Lemmon || Mount Lemmon Survey || — || align=right | 6.2 km || 
|-id=216 bgcolor=#d6d6d6
| 330216 ||  || — || April 2, 2006 || Anderson Mesa || LONEOS || EUP || align=right | 5.5 km || 
|-id=217 bgcolor=#d6d6d6
| 330217 ||  || — || April 13, 2006 || Palomar || NEAT || EUP || align=right | 5.6 km || 
|-id=218 bgcolor=#d6d6d6
| 330218 ||  || — || April 18, 2006 || Palomar || NEAT || EUP || align=right | 7.0 km || 
|-id=219 bgcolor=#d6d6d6
| 330219 ||  || — || April 19, 2006 || Kitt Peak || Spacewatch || — || align=right | 3.3 km || 
|-id=220 bgcolor=#d6d6d6
| 330220 ||  || — || April 24, 2006 || Mount Lemmon || Mount Lemmon Survey || — || align=right | 4.4 km || 
|-id=221 bgcolor=#d6d6d6
| 330221 ||  || — || April 25, 2006 || Kitt Peak || Spacewatch || — || align=right | 3.9 km || 
|-id=222 bgcolor=#d6d6d6
| 330222 ||  || — || April 25, 2006 || Kitt Peak || Spacewatch || — || align=right | 3.8 km || 
|-id=223 bgcolor=#d6d6d6
| 330223 ||  || — || March 2, 2006 || Mount Lemmon || Mount Lemmon Survey || — || align=right | 3.6 km || 
|-id=224 bgcolor=#d6d6d6
| 330224 ||  || — || April 26, 2006 || Kitt Peak || Spacewatch || — || align=right | 3.4 km || 
|-id=225 bgcolor=#d6d6d6
| 330225 ||  || — || May 4, 2006 || Reedy Creek || J. Broughton || MEL || align=right | 5.2 km || 
|-id=226 bgcolor=#d6d6d6
| 330226 ||  || — || May 7, 2006 || Wrightwood || J. W. Young || — || align=right | 3.9 km || 
|-id=227 bgcolor=#d6d6d6
| 330227 ||  || — || May 1, 2006 || Kitt Peak || Spacewatch || VER || align=right | 3.9 km || 
|-id=228 bgcolor=#d6d6d6
| 330228 ||  || — || May 19, 2006 || Mount Lemmon || Mount Lemmon Survey || — || align=right | 3.8 km || 
|-id=229 bgcolor=#d6d6d6
| 330229 ||  || — || May 20, 2006 || Kitt Peak || Spacewatch || — || align=right | 3.7 km || 
|-id=230 bgcolor=#d6d6d6
| 330230 ||  || — || May 20, 2006 || Catalina || CSS || — || align=right | 5.2 km || 
|-id=231 bgcolor=#d6d6d6
| 330231 ||  || — || May 20, 2006 || Catalina || CSS || — || align=right | 3.9 km || 
|-id=232 bgcolor=#d6d6d6
| 330232 ||  || — || October 10, 2002 || Palomar || NEAT || — || align=right | 3.7 km || 
|-id=233 bgcolor=#FFC2E0
| 330233 ||  || — || May 26, 2006 || Mount Lemmon || Mount Lemmon Survey || APOPHAcritical || align=right data-sort-value="0.65" | 650 m || 
|-id=234 bgcolor=#d6d6d6
| 330234 ||  || — || May 25, 2006 || Kitt Peak || Spacewatch || — || align=right | 3.7 km || 
|-id=235 bgcolor=#d6d6d6
| 330235 ||  || — || May 25, 2006 || Kitt Peak || Spacewatch || — || align=right | 4.3 km || 
|-id=236 bgcolor=#d6d6d6
| 330236 ||  || — || May 31, 2006 || Kitt Peak || Spacewatch || — || align=right | 5.5 km || 
|-id=237 bgcolor=#fefefe
| 330237 ||  || — || June 21, 2006 || Kitt Peak || Spacewatch || MAS || align=right data-sort-value="0.82" | 820 m || 
|-id=238 bgcolor=#fefefe
| 330238 ||  || — || August 14, 2006 || Palomar || NEAT || — || align=right data-sort-value="0.85" | 850 m || 
|-id=239 bgcolor=#fefefe
| 330239 ||  || — || August 16, 2006 || Siding Spring || SSS || — || align=right data-sort-value="0.82" | 820 m || 
|-id=240 bgcolor=#fefefe
| 330240 ||  || — || August 17, 2006 || Palomar || NEAT || — || align=right data-sort-value="0.86" | 860 m || 
|-id=241 bgcolor=#fefefe
| 330241 ||  || — || August 20, 2006 || Palomar || NEAT || — || align=right data-sort-value="0.72" | 720 m || 
|-id=242 bgcolor=#fefefe
| 330242 ||  || — || August 27, 2006 || Kitt Peak || Spacewatch || FLO || align=right data-sort-value="0.60" | 600 m || 
|-id=243 bgcolor=#fefefe
| 330243 ||  || — || August 16, 2006 || Palomar || NEAT || — || align=right data-sort-value="0.78" | 780 m || 
|-id=244 bgcolor=#fefefe
| 330244 ||  || — || August 16, 2006 || Palomar || NEAT || — || align=right data-sort-value="0.83" | 830 m || 
|-id=245 bgcolor=#fefefe
| 330245 ||  || — || August 24, 2006 || Socorro || LINEAR || — || align=right data-sort-value="0.84" | 840 m || 
|-id=246 bgcolor=#fefefe
| 330246 ||  || — || August 16, 2006 || Palomar || NEAT || — || align=right data-sort-value="0.79" | 790 m || 
|-id=247 bgcolor=#E9E9E9
| 330247 ||  || — || August 30, 2006 || Mayhill || A. Lowe || — || align=right | 2.1 km || 
|-id=248 bgcolor=#fefefe
| 330248 ||  || — || September 12, 2006 || Catalina || CSS || — || align=right data-sort-value="0.81" | 810 m || 
|-id=249 bgcolor=#fefefe
| 330249 ||  || — || September 13, 2006 || Palomar || NEAT || — || align=right | 1.2 km || 
|-id=250 bgcolor=#FA8072
| 330250 ||  || — || September 14, 2006 || Kitt Peak || Spacewatch || — || align=right | 1.4 km || 
|-id=251 bgcolor=#fefefe
| 330251 ||  || — || September 13, 2006 || Palomar || NEAT || — || align=right data-sort-value="0.81" | 810 m || 
|-id=252 bgcolor=#d6d6d6
| 330252 ||  || — || September 12, 2006 || Catalina || CSS || Tj (2.96) || align=right | 5.7 km || 
|-id=253 bgcolor=#fefefe
| 330253 ||  || — || September 14, 2006 || Kitt Peak || Spacewatch || — || align=right data-sort-value="0.67" | 670 m || 
|-id=254 bgcolor=#fefefe
| 330254 ||  || — || September 14, 2006 || Kitt Peak || Spacewatch || FLO || align=right data-sort-value="0.64" | 640 m || 
|-id=255 bgcolor=#fefefe
| 330255 ||  || — || September 14, 2006 || Kitt Peak || Spacewatch || NYS || align=right data-sort-value="0.75" | 750 m || 
|-id=256 bgcolor=#fefefe
| 330256 ||  || — || September 15, 2006 || Kitt Peak || Spacewatch || — || align=right data-sort-value="0.78" | 780 m || 
|-id=257 bgcolor=#fefefe
| 330257 ||  || — || September 15, 2006 || Kitt Peak || Spacewatch || — || align=right data-sort-value="0.85" | 850 m || 
|-id=258 bgcolor=#fefefe
| 330258 ||  || — || September 14, 2006 || Palomar || NEAT || — || align=right data-sort-value="0.80" | 800 m || 
|-id=259 bgcolor=#fefefe
| 330259 ||  || — || September 14, 2006 || Mauna Kea || J. Masiero || MAS || align=right data-sort-value="0.69" | 690 m || 
|-id=260 bgcolor=#FA8072
| 330260 ||  || — || September 17, 2006 || Kitt Peak || Spacewatch || — || align=right | 1.6 km || 
|-id=261 bgcolor=#fefefe
| 330261 ||  || — || September 16, 2006 || Catalina || CSS || V || align=right data-sort-value="0.98" | 980 m || 
|-id=262 bgcolor=#fefefe
| 330262 ||  || — || September 17, 2006 || Catalina || CSS || — || align=right data-sort-value="0.65" | 650 m || 
|-id=263 bgcolor=#FA8072
| 330263 ||  || — || September 17, 2006 || Anderson Mesa || LONEOS || — || align=right data-sort-value="0.65" | 650 m || 
|-id=264 bgcolor=#fefefe
| 330264 ||  || — || September 18, 2006 || Catalina || CSS || FLO || align=right data-sort-value="0.73" | 730 m || 
|-id=265 bgcolor=#fefefe
| 330265 ||  || — || September 17, 2006 || Kitt Peak || Spacewatch || — || align=right data-sort-value="0.93" | 930 m || 
|-id=266 bgcolor=#fefefe
| 330266 ||  || — || September 18, 2006 || Catalina || CSS || NYS || align=right data-sort-value="0.74" | 740 m || 
|-id=267 bgcolor=#fefefe
| 330267 ||  || — || September 19, 2006 || Kitt Peak || Spacewatch || — || align=right data-sort-value="0.75" | 750 m || 
|-id=268 bgcolor=#fefefe
| 330268 ||  || — || September 19, 2006 || Kitt Peak || Spacewatch || — || align=right data-sort-value="0.59" | 590 m || 
|-id=269 bgcolor=#fefefe
| 330269 ||  || — || September 19, 2006 || Kitt Peak || Spacewatch || — || align=right data-sort-value="0.98" | 980 m || 
|-id=270 bgcolor=#fefefe
| 330270 ||  || — || September 18, 2006 || Kitt Peak || Spacewatch || NYS || align=right data-sort-value="0.70" | 700 m || 
|-id=271 bgcolor=#fefefe
| 330271 ||  || — || September 18, 2006 || Catalina || CSS || — || align=right | 2.8 km || 
|-id=272 bgcolor=#fefefe
| 330272 ||  || — || September 24, 2006 || Calvin-Rehoboth || L. A. Molnar || FLO || align=right data-sort-value="0.58" | 580 m || 
|-id=273 bgcolor=#fefefe
| 330273 ||  || — || September 20, 2006 || Catalina || CSS || — || align=right data-sort-value="0.99" | 990 m || 
|-id=274 bgcolor=#fefefe
| 330274 ||  || — || September 19, 2006 || Kitt Peak || Spacewatch || — || align=right data-sort-value="0.75" | 750 m || 
|-id=275 bgcolor=#fefefe
| 330275 ||  || — || September 25, 2006 || Mount Lemmon || Mount Lemmon Survey || FLO || align=right data-sort-value="0.62" | 620 m || 
|-id=276 bgcolor=#fefefe
| 330276 ||  || — || September 26, 2006 || Socorro || LINEAR || — || align=right data-sort-value="0.88" | 880 m || 
|-id=277 bgcolor=#fefefe
| 330277 ||  || — || September 28, 2006 || Kitt Peak || Spacewatch || NYS || align=right data-sort-value="0.73" | 730 m || 
|-id=278 bgcolor=#fefefe
| 330278 ||  || — || September 26, 2006 || Kitt Peak || Spacewatch || — || align=right data-sort-value="0.72" | 720 m || 
|-id=279 bgcolor=#E9E9E9
| 330279 ||  || — || September 27, 2006 || Kitt Peak || Spacewatch || — || align=right | 1.2 km || 
|-id=280 bgcolor=#fefefe
| 330280 ||  || — || December 14, 2003 || Kitt Peak || Spacewatch || V || align=right data-sort-value="0.67" | 670 m || 
|-id=281 bgcolor=#fefefe
| 330281 ||  || — || September 25, 2006 || Kitt Peak || Spacewatch || FLO || align=right data-sort-value="0.47" | 470 m || 
|-id=282 bgcolor=#fefefe
| 330282 ||  || — || September 26, 2006 || Catalina || CSS || — || align=right | 1.1 km || 
|-id=283 bgcolor=#fefefe
| 330283 ||  || — || September 27, 2006 || Catalina || CSS || V || align=right data-sort-value="0.87" | 870 m || 
|-id=284 bgcolor=#fefefe
| 330284 ||  || — || September 20, 2006 || Anderson Mesa || LONEOS || FLO || align=right data-sort-value="0.71" | 710 m || 
|-id=285 bgcolor=#E9E9E9
| 330285 ||  || — || September 30, 2006 || Mount Lemmon || Mount Lemmon Survey || — || align=right | 2.0 km || 
|-id=286 bgcolor=#fefefe
| 330286 ||  || — || September 18, 2006 || Kitt Peak || Spacewatch || V || align=right data-sort-value="0.72" | 720 m || 
|-id=287 bgcolor=#fefefe
| 330287 ||  || — || September 18, 2006 || Kitt Peak || Spacewatch || MAS || align=right data-sort-value="0.84" | 840 m || 
|-id=288 bgcolor=#fefefe
| 330288 ||  || — || September 28, 2006 || Mount Lemmon || Mount Lemmon Survey || V || align=right data-sort-value="0.74" | 740 m || 
|-id=289 bgcolor=#fefefe
| 330289 ||  || — || September 17, 2006 || Catalina || CSS || V || align=right data-sort-value="0.86" | 860 m || 
|-id=290 bgcolor=#fefefe
| 330290 ||  || — || October 3, 2006 || Mount Lemmon || Mount Lemmon Survey || — || align=right data-sort-value="0.87" | 870 m || 
|-id=291 bgcolor=#fefefe
| 330291 ||  || — || October 11, 2006 || Kitt Peak || Spacewatch || MAS || align=right data-sort-value="0.68" | 680 m || 
|-id=292 bgcolor=#fefefe
| 330292 ||  || — || October 11, 2006 || Kitt Peak || Spacewatch || — || align=right data-sort-value="0.68" | 680 m || 
|-id=293 bgcolor=#E9E9E9
| 330293 ||  || — || October 11, 2006 || Kitt Peak || Spacewatch || — || align=right data-sort-value="0.76" | 760 m || 
|-id=294 bgcolor=#fefefe
| 330294 ||  || — || October 12, 2006 || Palomar || NEAT || NYS || align=right data-sort-value="0.64" | 640 m || 
|-id=295 bgcolor=#fefefe
| 330295 ||  || — || October 12, 2006 || Kitt Peak || Spacewatch || V || align=right data-sort-value="0.82" | 820 m || 
|-id=296 bgcolor=#fefefe
| 330296 ||  || — || October 12, 2006 || Kitt Peak || Spacewatch || — || align=right data-sort-value="0.75" | 750 m || 
|-id=297 bgcolor=#fefefe
| 330297 ||  || — || October 3, 2006 || Mount Lemmon || Mount Lemmon Survey || NYS || align=right data-sort-value="0.70" | 700 m || 
|-id=298 bgcolor=#fefefe
| 330298 ||  || — || October 10, 2006 || Palomar || NEAT || FLO || align=right data-sort-value="0.55" | 550 m || 
|-id=299 bgcolor=#fefefe
| 330299 ||  || — || October 10, 2006 || Palomar || NEAT || — || align=right data-sort-value="0.94" | 940 m || 
|-id=300 bgcolor=#fefefe
| 330300 ||  || — || October 11, 2006 || Palomar || NEAT || — || align=right data-sort-value="0.86" | 860 m || 
|}

330301–330400 

|-bgcolor=#fefefe
| 330301 ||  || — || October 11, 2006 || Palomar || NEAT || — || align=right data-sort-value="0.91" | 910 m || 
|-id=302 bgcolor=#fefefe
| 330302 ||  || — || October 11, 2006 || Palomar || NEAT || — || align=right data-sort-value="0.98" | 980 m || 
|-id=303 bgcolor=#d6d6d6
| 330303 ||  || — || October 11, 2006 || Palomar || NEAT || SHU3:2 || align=right | 6.7 km || 
|-id=304 bgcolor=#fefefe
| 330304 ||  || — || October 11, 2006 || Palomar || NEAT || — || align=right data-sort-value="0.98" | 980 m || 
|-id=305 bgcolor=#fefefe
| 330305 ||  || — || October 11, 2006 || Palomar || NEAT || — || align=right data-sort-value="0.75" | 750 m || 
|-id=306 bgcolor=#fefefe
| 330306 ||  || — || October 14, 2006 || Lulin Observatory || C.-S. Lin, Q.-z. Ye || V || align=right data-sort-value="0.73" | 730 m || 
|-id=307 bgcolor=#fefefe
| 330307 ||  || — || October 3, 2006 || Mount Lemmon || Mount Lemmon Survey || FLO || align=right data-sort-value="0.73" | 730 m || 
|-id=308 bgcolor=#fefefe
| 330308 ||  || — || October 1, 2006 || Kitt Peak || Spacewatch || V || align=right data-sort-value="0.61" | 610 m || 
|-id=309 bgcolor=#fefefe
| 330309 ||  || — || October 16, 2006 || Kitt Peak || Spacewatch || — || align=right data-sort-value="0.95" | 950 m || 
|-id=310 bgcolor=#fefefe
| 330310 ||  || — || October 16, 2006 || Catalina || CSS || FLO || align=right data-sort-value="0.80" | 800 m || 
|-id=311 bgcolor=#fefefe
| 330311 ||  || — || October 16, 2006 || Kitt Peak || Spacewatch || V || align=right data-sort-value="0.70" | 700 m || 
|-id=312 bgcolor=#fefefe
| 330312 ||  || — || October 16, 2006 || Kitt Peak || Spacewatch || CLA || align=right | 1.6 km || 
|-id=313 bgcolor=#fefefe
| 330313 ||  || — || October 16, 2006 || Kitt Peak || Spacewatch || — || align=right data-sort-value="0.84" | 840 m || 
|-id=314 bgcolor=#fefefe
| 330314 ||  || — || October 16, 2006 || Kitt Peak || Spacewatch || — || align=right data-sort-value="0.72" | 720 m || 
|-id=315 bgcolor=#fefefe
| 330315 ||  || — || October 16, 2006 || Kitt Peak || Spacewatch || — || align=right data-sort-value="0.92" | 920 m || 
|-id=316 bgcolor=#fefefe
| 330316 ||  || — || October 16, 2006 || Kitt Peak || Spacewatch || — || align=right data-sort-value="0.91" | 910 m || 
|-id=317 bgcolor=#fefefe
| 330317 ||  || — || October 17, 2006 || Kitt Peak || Spacewatch || — || align=right | 1.0 km || 
|-id=318 bgcolor=#d6d6d6
| 330318 ||  || — || October 16, 2006 || Catalina || CSS || — || align=right | 3.5 km || 
|-id=319 bgcolor=#fefefe
| 330319 ||  || — || October 17, 2006 || Mount Lemmon || Mount Lemmon Survey || V || align=right data-sort-value="0.85" | 850 m || 
|-id=320 bgcolor=#fefefe
| 330320 ||  || — || October 17, 2006 || Kitt Peak || Spacewatch || NYS || align=right data-sort-value="0.69" | 690 m || 
|-id=321 bgcolor=#fefefe
| 330321 ||  || — || October 18, 2006 || Kitt Peak || Spacewatch || — || align=right data-sort-value="0.70" | 700 m || 
|-id=322 bgcolor=#E9E9E9
| 330322 ||  || — || October 18, 2006 || Kitt Peak || Spacewatch || — || align=right | 1.4 km || 
|-id=323 bgcolor=#fefefe
| 330323 ||  || — || October 18, 2006 || Kitt Peak || Spacewatch || — || align=right | 1.1 km || 
|-id=324 bgcolor=#fefefe
| 330324 ||  || — || October 19, 2006 || Kitt Peak || Spacewatch || MAS || align=right data-sort-value="0.71" | 710 m || 
|-id=325 bgcolor=#fefefe
| 330325 ||  || — || October 19, 2006 || Kitt Peak || Spacewatch || MAS || align=right data-sort-value="0.74" | 740 m || 
|-id=326 bgcolor=#fefefe
| 330326 ||  || — || October 21, 2006 || Mount Lemmon || Mount Lemmon Survey || — || align=right data-sort-value="0.81" | 810 m || 
|-id=327 bgcolor=#fefefe
| 330327 ||  || — || October 16, 2006 || Catalina || CSS || — || align=right | 1.1 km || 
|-id=328 bgcolor=#fefefe
| 330328 ||  || — || October 16, 2006 || Catalina || CSS || FLO || align=right data-sort-value="0.91" | 910 m || 
|-id=329 bgcolor=#fefefe
| 330329 ||  || — || September 30, 2006 || Catalina || CSS || — || align=right data-sort-value="0.90" | 900 m || 
|-id=330 bgcolor=#fefefe
| 330330 ||  || — || October 17, 2006 || Catalina || CSS || FLO || align=right data-sort-value="0.72" | 720 m || 
|-id=331 bgcolor=#fefefe
| 330331 ||  || — || August 30, 2006 || Anderson Mesa || LONEOS || FLO || align=right data-sort-value="0.77" | 770 m || 
|-id=332 bgcolor=#E9E9E9
| 330332 ||  || — || October 19, 2006 || Catalina || CSS || — || align=right | 1.1 km || 
|-id=333 bgcolor=#fefefe
| 330333 ||  || — || October 23, 2006 || Kitt Peak || Spacewatch || — || align=right data-sort-value="0.76" | 760 m || 
|-id=334 bgcolor=#fefefe
| 330334 ||  || — || October 16, 2006 || Kitt Peak || Spacewatch || — || align=right | 1.4 km || 
|-id=335 bgcolor=#E9E9E9
| 330335 ||  || — || October 21, 2006 || Mount Lemmon || Mount Lemmon Survey || — || align=right data-sort-value="0.88" | 880 m || 
|-id=336 bgcolor=#fefefe
| 330336 ||  || — || October 31, 2006 || Bergisch Gladbac || W. Bickel || MAS || align=right data-sort-value="0.72" | 720 m || 
|-id=337 bgcolor=#fefefe
| 330337 ||  || — || October 27, 2006 || Kitt Peak || Spacewatch || — || align=right data-sort-value="0.89" | 890 m || 
|-id=338 bgcolor=#E9E9E9
| 330338 ||  || — || October 27, 2006 || Mount Lemmon || Mount Lemmon Survey || — || align=right data-sort-value="0.91" | 910 m || 
|-id=339 bgcolor=#fefefe
| 330339 ||  || — || October 28, 2006 || Mount Lemmon || Mount Lemmon Survey || 417 || align=right data-sort-value="0.72" | 720 m || 
|-id=340 bgcolor=#d6d6d6
| 330340 ||  || — || September 27, 2006 || Mount Lemmon || Mount Lemmon Survey || — || align=right | 2.8 km || 
|-id=341 bgcolor=#fefefe
| 330341 ||  || — || October 23, 2006 || Catalina || CSS || — || align=right | 1.7 km || 
|-id=342 bgcolor=#fefefe
| 330342 ||  || — || October 28, 2006 || Catalina || CSS || — || align=right | 1.1 km || 
|-id=343 bgcolor=#fefefe
| 330343 ||  || — || October 23, 2006 || Kitt Peak || Spacewatch || — || align=right data-sort-value="0.94" | 940 m || 
|-id=344 bgcolor=#fefefe
| 330344 ||  || — || November 11, 2006 || Mount Lemmon || Mount Lemmon Survey || V || align=right data-sort-value="0.67" | 670 m || 
|-id=345 bgcolor=#fefefe
| 330345 ||  || — || November 11, 2006 || Mount Lemmon || Mount Lemmon Survey || NYS || align=right data-sort-value="0.87" | 870 m || 
|-id=346 bgcolor=#E9E9E9
| 330346 ||  || — || November 9, 2006 || Kitt Peak || Spacewatch || — || align=right | 1.8 km || 
|-id=347 bgcolor=#fefefe
| 330347 ||  || — || November 9, 2006 || Kitt Peak || Spacewatch || — || align=right | 1.1 km || 
|-id=348 bgcolor=#fefefe
| 330348 ||  || — || November 11, 2006 || Kitt Peak || Spacewatch || FLO || align=right data-sort-value="0.76" | 760 m || 
|-id=349 bgcolor=#fefefe
| 330349 ||  || — || November 11, 2006 || Catalina || CSS || — || align=right data-sort-value="0.90" | 900 m || 
|-id=350 bgcolor=#E9E9E9
| 330350 ||  || — || November 11, 2006 || Catalina || CSS || MIS || align=right | 2.5 km || 
|-id=351 bgcolor=#fefefe
| 330351 ||  || — || November 12, 2006 || Mount Lemmon || Mount Lemmon Survey || MAS || align=right data-sort-value="0.69" | 690 m || 
|-id=352 bgcolor=#fefefe
| 330352 ||  || — || November 12, 2006 || Mount Lemmon || Mount Lemmon Survey || — || align=right data-sort-value="0.85" | 850 m || 
|-id=353 bgcolor=#fefefe
| 330353 ||  || — || November 12, 2006 || Mount Lemmon || Mount Lemmon Survey || — || align=right data-sort-value="0.81" | 810 m || 
|-id=354 bgcolor=#fefefe
| 330354 ||  || — || November 11, 2006 || Kitt Peak || Spacewatch || FLO || align=right data-sort-value="0.65" | 650 m || 
|-id=355 bgcolor=#fefefe
| 330355 ||  || — || November 11, 2006 || Kitt Peak || Spacewatch || V || align=right data-sort-value="0.68" | 680 m || 
|-id=356 bgcolor=#fefefe
| 330356 ||  || — || November 11, 2006 || Catalina || CSS || MAS || align=right data-sort-value="0.72" | 720 m || 
|-id=357 bgcolor=#fefefe
| 330357 ||  || — || November 11, 2006 || Kitt Peak || Spacewatch || V || align=right data-sort-value="0.81" | 810 m || 
|-id=358 bgcolor=#fefefe
| 330358 ||  || — || November 15, 2006 || Catalina || CSS || — || align=right | 1.0 km || 
|-id=359 bgcolor=#fefefe
| 330359 ||  || — || November 14, 2006 || Kitt Peak || Spacewatch || — || align=right data-sort-value="0.83" | 830 m || 
|-id=360 bgcolor=#E9E9E9
| 330360 ||  || — || November 14, 2006 || Kitt Peak || Spacewatch || — || align=right | 1.0 km || 
|-id=361 bgcolor=#E9E9E9
| 330361 ||  || — || October 21, 2006 || Mount Lemmon || Mount Lemmon Survey || MAR || align=right | 1.2 km || 
|-id=362 bgcolor=#fefefe
| 330362 ||  || — || November 9, 2006 || Apache Point || A. E. Rose, A. C. Becker || — || align=right data-sort-value="0.80" | 800 m || 
|-id=363 bgcolor=#fefefe
| 330363 ||  || — || November 15, 2006 || Mount Lemmon || Mount Lemmon Survey || — || align=right data-sort-value="0.84" | 840 m || 
|-id=364 bgcolor=#E9E9E9
| 330364 ||  || — || November 1, 2006 || Mount Lemmon || Mount Lemmon Survey || GER || align=right | 2.1 km || 
|-id=365 bgcolor=#fefefe
| 330365 ||  || — || November 16, 2006 || Kitt Peak || Spacewatch || — || align=right data-sort-value="0.97" | 970 m || 
|-id=366 bgcolor=#fefefe
| 330366 ||  || — || November 17, 2006 || Socorro || LINEAR || V || align=right data-sort-value="0.99" | 990 m || 
|-id=367 bgcolor=#fefefe
| 330367 ||  || — || November 18, 2006 || La Sagra || OAM Obs. || — || align=right data-sort-value="0.89" | 890 m || 
|-id=368 bgcolor=#fefefe
| 330368 ||  || — || November 16, 2006 || Kitt Peak || Spacewatch || — || align=right data-sort-value="0.90" | 900 m || 
|-id=369 bgcolor=#fefefe
| 330369 ||  || — || November 16, 2006 || Kitt Peak || Spacewatch || V || align=right data-sort-value="0.79" | 790 m || 
|-id=370 bgcolor=#fefefe
| 330370 ||  || — || November 16, 2006 || Kitt Peak || Spacewatch || — || align=right data-sort-value="0.91" | 910 m || 
|-id=371 bgcolor=#fefefe
| 330371 ||  || — || November 18, 2006 || Kitt Peak || Spacewatch || — || align=right data-sort-value="0.99" | 990 m || 
|-id=372 bgcolor=#fefefe
| 330372 ||  || — || November 19, 2006 || Kitt Peak || Spacewatch || — || align=right data-sort-value="0.88" | 880 m || 
|-id=373 bgcolor=#d6d6d6
| 330373 ||  || — || November 19, 2006 || Catalina || CSS || HIL3:2 || align=right | 6.8 km || 
|-id=374 bgcolor=#fefefe
| 330374 ||  || — || November 23, 2006 || Kitt Peak || Spacewatch || — || align=right | 1.4 km || 
|-id=375 bgcolor=#E9E9E9
| 330375 ||  || — || September 28, 2006 || Mount Lemmon || Mount Lemmon Survey || — || align=right | 1.9 km || 
|-id=376 bgcolor=#E9E9E9
| 330376 ||  || — || November 25, 2006 || Catalina || CSS || — || align=right | 2.5 km || 
|-id=377 bgcolor=#E9E9E9
| 330377 ||  || — || November 27, 2006 || Mount Lemmon || Mount Lemmon Survey || — || align=right | 1.9 km || 
|-id=378 bgcolor=#E9E9E9
| 330378 ||  || — || November 28, 2006 || Mount Lemmon || Mount Lemmon Survey || — || align=right | 2.5 km || 
|-id=379 bgcolor=#fefefe
| 330379 || 2006 XU || — || December 10, 2006 || Pla D'Arguines || R. Ferrando || — || align=right | 1.1 km || 
|-id=380 bgcolor=#E9E9E9
| 330380 ||  || — || December 14, 2006 || Vicques || M. Ory || BRG || align=right | 1.9 km || 
|-id=381 bgcolor=#fefefe
| 330381 ||  || — || December 9, 2006 || Kitt Peak || Spacewatch || — || align=right | 1.1 km || 
|-id=382 bgcolor=#E9E9E9
| 330382 ||  || — || February 6, 2003 || Palomar || NEAT || IAN || align=right data-sort-value="0.91" | 910 m || 
|-id=383 bgcolor=#E9E9E9
| 330383 ||  || — || December 10, 2006 || Kitt Peak || Spacewatch || — || align=right | 1.2 km || 
|-id=384 bgcolor=#E9E9E9
| 330384 ||  || — || December 10, 2006 || Kitt Peak || Spacewatch || — || align=right | 2.1 km || 
|-id=385 bgcolor=#E9E9E9
| 330385 ||  || — || December 10, 2006 || Kitt Peak || Spacewatch || — || align=right | 1.4 km || 
|-id=386 bgcolor=#E9E9E9
| 330386 ||  || — || December 11, 2006 || Kitt Peak || Spacewatch || EUN || align=right | 1.1 km || 
|-id=387 bgcolor=#fefefe
| 330387 ||  || — || December 13, 2006 || Catalina || CSS || — || align=right | 1.3 km || 
|-id=388 bgcolor=#fefefe
| 330388 ||  || — || December 14, 2006 || Mount Lemmon || Mount Lemmon Survey || — || align=right data-sort-value="0.98" | 980 m || 
|-id=389 bgcolor=#E9E9E9
| 330389 ||  || — || December 14, 2006 || Kitt Peak || Spacewatch || — || align=right | 1.3 km || 
|-id=390 bgcolor=#E9E9E9
| 330390 ||  || — || December 16, 2006 || Mount Lemmon || Mount Lemmon Survey || — || align=right | 4.0 km || 
|-id=391 bgcolor=#E9E9E9
| 330391 ||  || — || December 16, 2006 || Mount Lemmon || Mount Lemmon Survey || — || align=right | 1.5 km || 
|-id=392 bgcolor=#E9E9E9
| 330392 ||  || — || December 17, 2006 || Socorro || LINEAR || — || align=right | 4.2 km || 
|-id=393 bgcolor=#E9E9E9
| 330393 ||  || — || December 24, 2006 || Gnosca || S. Sposetti || — || align=right | 1.4 km || 
|-id=394 bgcolor=#fefefe
| 330394 ||  || — || December 25, 2006 || Junk Bond || D. Healy || ERI || align=right | 1.6 km || 
|-id=395 bgcolor=#E9E9E9
| 330395 ||  || — || September 28, 2006 || Mount Lemmon || Mount Lemmon Survey || — || align=right | 1.3 km || 
|-id=396 bgcolor=#fefefe
| 330396 ||  || — || December 21, 2006 || Kitt Peak || Spacewatch || — || align=right | 1.0 km || 
|-id=397 bgcolor=#fefefe
| 330397 ||  || — || December 21, 2006 || Kitt Peak || Spacewatch || — || align=right data-sort-value="0.91" | 910 m || 
|-id=398 bgcolor=#E9E9E9
| 330398 ||  || — || December 16, 2006 || Kitt Peak || Spacewatch || — || align=right | 2.3 km || 
|-id=399 bgcolor=#E9E9E9
| 330399 ||  || — || December 21, 2006 || Mount Lemmon || Mount Lemmon Survey || — || align=right | 1.5 km || 
|-id=400 bgcolor=#E9E9E9
| 330400 ||  || — || January 8, 2007 || Kitt Peak || Spacewatch || — || align=right | 1.3 km || 
|}

330401–330500 

|-bgcolor=#E9E9E9
| 330401 ||  || — || January 15, 2007 || Catalina || CSS || — || align=right | 1.2 km || 
|-id=402 bgcolor=#E9E9E9
| 330402 ||  || — || January 17, 2007 || Kitt Peak || Spacewatch || — || align=right | 2.3 km || 
|-id=403 bgcolor=#E9E9E9
| 330403 ||  || — || January 17, 2007 || Kitt Peak || Spacewatch || — || align=right | 1.5 km || 
|-id=404 bgcolor=#E9E9E9
| 330404 ||  || — || January 17, 2007 || Palomar || NEAT || — || align=right | 1.2 km || 
|-id=405 bgcolor=#E9E9E9
| 330405 ||  || — || December 13, 2006 || Kitt Peak || Spacewatch || — || align=right | 1.3 km || 
|-id=406 bgcolor=#E9E9E9
| 330406 ||  || — || November 27, 2006 || Mount Lemmon || Mount Lemmon Survey || — || align=right | 1.2 km || 
|-id=407 bgcolor=#E9E9E9
| 330407 ||  || — || January 24, 2007 || Nyukasa || Mount Nyukasa Stn. || — || align=right | 1.7 km || 
|-id=408 bgcolor=#E9E9E9
| 330408 ||  || — || January 24, 2007 || Catalina || CSS || — || align=right | 1.5 km || 
|-id=409 bgcolor=#E9E9E9
| 330409 ||  || — || December 15, 2006 || Mount Lemmon || Mount Lemmon Survey || — || align=right | 1.2 km || 
|-id=410 bgcolor=#E9E9E9
| 330410 ||  || — || January 26, 2007 || Kitt Peak || Spacewatch || — || align=right | 1.7 km || 
|-id=411 bgcolor=#E9E9E9
| 330411 ||  || — || January 17, 2007 || Kitt Peak || Spacewatch || NEM || align=right | 2.5 km || 
|-id=412 bgcolor=#E9E9E9
| 330412 ||  || — || November 23, 2006 || Mount Lemmon || Mount Lemmon Survey || — || align=right | 2.6 km || 
|-id=413 bgcolor=#E9E9E9
| 330413 ||  || — || January 24, 2007 || Catalina || CSS || RAF || align=right | 1.2 km || 
|-id=414 bgcolor=#E9E9E9
| 330414 ||  || — || January 27, 2007 || Mount Lemmon || Mount Lemmon Survey || — || align=right | 1.1 km || 
|-id=415 bgcolor=#E9E9E9
| 330415 ||  || — || February 6, 2007 || Kitt Peak || Spacewatch || — || align=right | 1.5 km || 
|-id=416 bgcolor=#E9E9E9
| 330416 ||  || — || February 7, 2007 || Kitt Peak || Spacewatch || — || align=right | 1.1 km || 
|-id=417 bgcolor=#E9E9E9
| 330417 ||  || — || December 2, 2005 || Kitt Peak || Spacewatch || — || align=right | 2.8 km || 
|-id=418 bgcolor=#E9E9E9
| 330418 ||  || — || February 8, 2007 || Mount Lemmon || Mount Lemmon Survey || — || align=right | 1.8 km || 
|-id=419 bgcolor=#E9E9E9
| 330419 ||  || — || February 9, 2007 || Catalina || CSS || — || align=right | 1.8 km || 
|-id=420 bgcolor=#E9E9E9
| 330420 Tomroman ||  ||  || February 11, 2007 || CBA-NOVAC || D. R. Skillman || — || align=right | 2.1 km || 
|-id=421 bgcolor=#E9E9E9
| 330421 ||  || — || February 9, 2007 || Marly || P. Kocher || — || align=right | 2.7 km || 
|-id=422 bgcolor=#E9E9E9
| 330422 ||  || — || April 20, 2004 || Kitt Peak || Spacewatch || EUN || align=right | 1.7 km || 
|-id=423 bgcolor=#E9E9E9
| 330423 ||  || — || February 6, 2007 || Mount Lemmon || Mount Lemmon Survey || — || align=right | 1.6 km || 
|-id=424 bgcolor=#E9E9E9
| 330424 ||  || — || February 8, 2007 || Palomar || NEAT || — || align=right | 3.4 km || 
|-id=425 bgcolor=#E9E9E9
| 330425 ||  || — || February 8, 2007 || Palomar || NEAT || — || align=right | 3.5 km || 
|-id=426 bgcolor=#E9E9E9
| 330426 ||  || — || February 9, 2007 || Catalina || CSS || — || align=right | 1.3 km || 
|-id=427 bgcolor=#E9E9E9
| 330427 ||  || — || February 15, 2007 || Catalina || CSS || — || align=right | 2.0 km || 
|-id=428 bgcolor=#E9E9E9
| 330428 ||  || — || February 15, 2007 || Palomar || NEAT || ADE || align=right | 2.3 km || 
|-id=429 bgcolor=#E9E9E9
| 330429 ||  || — || February 10, 2007 || Mount Lemmon || Mount Lemmon Survey || — || align=right | 1.6 km || 
|-id=430 bgcolor=#E9E9E9
| 330430 ||  || — || November 1, 2005 || Mount Lemmon || Mount Lemmon Survey || HOF || align=right | 2.8 km || 
|-id=431 bgcolor=#E9E9E9
| 330431 ||  || — || February 17, 2007 || Kitt Peak || Spacewatch || — || align=right | 1.5 km || 
|-id=432 bgcolor=#E9E9E9
| 330432 ||  || — || February 16, 2007 || Catalina || CSS || — || align=right | 1.5 km || 
|-id=433 bgcolor=#E9E9E9
| 330433 ||  || — || February 16, 2007 || Mount Lemmon || Mount Lemmon Survey || — || align=right | 3.2 km || 
|-id=434 bgcolor=#E9E9E9
| 330434 ||  || — || October 1, 2005 || Mount Lemmon || Mount Lemmon Survey || — || align=right | 1.1 km || 
|-id=435 bgcolor=#E9E9E9
| 330435 ||  || — || February 17, 2007 || Kitt Peak || Spacewatch || — || align=right | 2.0 km || 
|-id=436 bgcolor=#E9E9E9
| 330436 ||  || — || February 17, 2007 || Kitt Peak || Spacewatch || — || align=right | 3.3 km || 
|-id=437 bgcolor=#d6d6d6
| 330437 ||  || — || February 19, 2007 || Kitt Peak || Spacewatch || — || align=right | 3.4 km || 
|-id=438 bgcolor=#d6d6d6
| 330438 ||  || — || February 21, 2007 || Mount Lemmon || Mount Lemmon Survey || — || align=right | 3.1 km || 
|-id=439 bgcolor=#E9E9E9
| 330439 ||  || — || February 21, 2007 || Kitt Peak || Spacewatch || — || align=right | 1.7 km || 
|-id=440 bgcolor=#E9E9E9
| 330440 Davinadon ||  ||  || February 23, 2007 || Mayhill || A. Lowe || — || align=right | 2.6 km || 
|-id=441 bgcolor=#E9E9E9
| 330441 ||  || — || February 21, 2007 || Kitt Peak || Spacewatch || HNA || align=right | 2.1 km || 
|-id=442 bgcolor=#E9E9E9
| 330442 ||  || — || February 23, 2007 || Kitt Peak || Spacewatch || AGN || align=right | 1.1 km || 
|-id=443 bgcolor=#E9E9E9
| 330443 ||  || — || February 23, 2007 || Kitt Peak || Spacewatch || MRX || align=right | 1.0 km || 
|-id=444 bgcolor=#E9E9E9
| 330444 ||  || — || February 23, 2007 || Mount Lemmon || Mount Lemmon Survey || HNS || align=right | 1.2 km || 
|-id=445 bgcolor=#E9E9E9
| 330445 ||  || — || February 17, 2007 || Mount Lemmon || Mount Lemmon Survey || — || align=right | 2.1 km || 
|-id=446 bgcolor=#E9E9E9
| 330446 ||  || — || February 23, 2007 || Kitt Peak || Spacewatch || PAD || align=right | 1.6 km || 
|-id=447 bgcolor=#d6d6d6
| 330447 ||  || — || December 27, 2006 || Catalina || CSS || — || align=right | 4.4 km || 
|-id=448 bgcolor=#E9E9E9
| 330448 ||  || — || February 17, 2007 || Kitt Peak || Spacewatch || — || align=right | 2.3 km || 
|-id=449 bgcolor=#E9E9E9
| 330449 ||  || — || March 9, 2007 || Kitt Peak || Spacewatch || — || align=right | 1.9 km || 
|-id=450 bgcolor=#E9E9E9
| 330450 ||  || — || March 9, 2007 || Mount Lemmon || Mount Lemmon Survey || NEM || align=right | 2.7 km || 
|-id=451 bgcolor=#E9E9E9
| 330451 ||  || — || March 9, 2007 || Mount Lemmon || Mount Lemmon Survey || — || align=right | 1.9 km || 
|-id=452 bgcolor=#E9E9E9
| 330452 ||  || — || March 9, 2007 || Palomar || NEAT || HNS || align=right | 1.6 km || 
|-id=453 bgcolor=#E9E9E9
| 330453 ||  || — || February 8, 2002 || Kitt Peak || Spacewatch || — || align=right | 2.1 km || 
|-id=454 bgcolor=#E9E9E9
| 330454 ||  || — || February 23, 2007 || Mount Lemmon || Mount Lemmon Survey || — || align=right | 1.5 km || 
|-id=455 bgcolor=#E9E9E9
| 330455 Anbrysse ||  ||  || November 9, 2005 || Uccle || P. De Cat || — || align=right | 1.4 km || 
|-id=456 bgcolor=#d6d6d6
| 330456 ||  || — || March 11, 2007 || Anderson Mesa || LONEOS || Tj (2.98) || align=right | 5.3 km || 
|-id=457 bgcolor=#E9E9E9
| 330457 ||  || — || March 9, 2007 || Kitt Peak || Spacewatch || — || align=right | 4.1 km || 
|-id=458 bgcolor=#E9E9E9
| 330458 ||  || — || March 13, 2007 || Mount Lemmon || Mount Lemmon Survey || GEF || align=right | 1.2 km || 
|-id=459 bgcolor=#E9E9E9
| 330459 ||  || — || March 9, 2007 || Mount Lemmon || Mount Lemmon Survey || — || align=right | 1.5 km || 
|-id=460 bgcolor=#d6d6d6
| 330460 ||  || — || March 12, 2007 || Kitt Peak || Spacewatch || — || align=right | 4.0 km || 
|-id=461 bgcolor=#E9E9E9
| 330461 ||  || — || March 12, 2007 || Mount Lemmon || Mount Lemmon Survey || — || align=right | 1.3 km || 
|-id=462 bgcolor=#E9E9E9
| 330462 ||  || — || March 12, 2007 || Mount Lemmon || Mount Lemmon Survey || — || align=right | 1.6 km || 
|-id=463 bgcolor=#E9E9E9
| 330463 ||  || — || March 12, 2007 || Mount Lemmon || Mount Lemmon Survey || — || align=right | 2.1 km || 
|-id=464 bgcolor=#E9E9E9
| 330464 ||  || — || March 14, 2007 || Mount Lemmon || Mount Lemmon Survey || — || align=right | 1.7 km || 
|-id=465 bgcolor=#E9E9E9
| 330465 ||  || — || March 14, 2007 || Kitt Peak || Spacewatch || — || align=right | 2.0 km || 
|-id=466 bgcolor=#E9E9E9
| 330466 ||  || — || March 13, 2007 || Mount Lemmon || Mount Lemmon Survey || INO || align=right | 1.2 km || 
|-id=467 bgcolor=#E9E9E9
| 330467 ||  || — || March 12, 2007 || Mount Lemmon || Mount Lemmon Survey || — || align=right | 1.6 km || 
|-id=468 bgcolor=#E9E9E9
| 330468 ||  || — || March 15, 2007 || Kitt Peak || Spacewatch || NEM || align=right | 2.5 km || 
|-id=469 bgcolor=#E9E9E9
| 330469 ||  || — || March 15, 2007 || Kitt Peak || Spacewatch || WIT || align=right data-sort-value="0.99" | 990 m || 
|-id=470 bgcolor=#E9E9E9
| 330470 ||  || — || March 13, 2007 || Catalina || CSS || GAL || align=right | 2.3 km || 
|-id=471 bgcolor=#E9E9E9
| 330471 ||  || — || March 9, 2007 || Catalina || CSS || — || align=right | 2.8 km || 
|-id=472 bgcolor=#E9E9E9
| 330472 ||  || — || March 10, 2007 || Mount Lemmon || Mount Lemmon Survey || GEF || align=right | 1.5 km || 
|-id=473 bgcolor=#E9E9E9
| 330473 ||  || — || March 11, 2007 || Mount Lemmon || Mount Lemmon Survey || — || align=right | 1.2 km || 
|-id=474 bgcolor=#E9E9E9
| 330474 ||  || — || March 13, 2007 || Kitt Peak || Spacewatch || WIT || align=right | 1.1 km || 
|-id=475 bgcolor=#E9E9E9
| 330475 ||  || — || March 15, 2007 || Kitt Peak || Spacewatch || HOF || align=right | 2.3 km || 
|-id=476 bgcolor=#E9E9E9
| 330476 ||  || — || August 17, 2004 || Wrightwood || J. W. Young || — || align=right | 1.9 km || 
|-id=477 bgcolor=#d6d6d6
| 330477 ||  || — || March 16, 2007 || Mount Lemmon || Mount Lemmon Survey || — || align=right | 1.8 km || 
|-id=478 bgcolor=#E9E9E9
| 330478 ||  || — || March 20, 2007 || Mount Lemmon || Mount Lemmon Survey || AGN || align=right | 1.1 km || 
|-id=479 bgcolor=#d6d6d6
| 330479 ||  || — || March 26, 2007 || Catalina || CSS || BRA || align=right | 2.3 km || 
|-id=480 bgcolor=#E9E9E9
| 330480 ||  || — || April 8, 2007 || Kitt Peak || Spacewatch || AGN || align=right | 1.5 km || 
|-id=481 bgcolor=#d6d6d6
| 330481 ||  || — || April 11, 2007 || Kitt Peak || Spacewatch || — || align=right | 3.1 km || 
|-id=482 bgcolor=#d6d6d6
| 330482 ||  || — || April 11, 2007 || Mount Lemmon || Mount Lemmon Survey || — || align=right | 3.3 km || 
|-id=483 bgcolor=#E9E9E9
| 330483 ||  || — || April 11, 2007 || Kleť || Kleť Obs. || DOR || align=right | 3.2 km || 
|-id=484 bgcolor=#d6d6d6
| 330484 ||  || — || April 14, 2007 || Kitt Peak || Spacewatch || — || align=right | 3.1 km || 
|-id=485 bgcolor=#E9E9E9
| 330485 ||  || — || April 14, 2007 || Mount Lemmon || Mount Lemmon Survey || — || align=right | 2.5 km || 
|-id=486 bgcolor=#d6d6d6
| 330486 ||  || — || April 14, 2007 || Kitt Peak || Spacewatch || EOS || align=right | 1.7 km || 
|-id=487 bgcolor=#d6d6d6
| 330487 ||  || — || April 14, 2007 || Kitt Peak || Spacewatch || — || align=right | 2.3 km || 
|-id=488 bgcolor=#E9E9E9
| 330488 ||  || — || April 15, 2007 || Kitt Peak || Spacewatch || — || align=right | 3.6 km || 
|-id=489 bgcolor=#d6d6d6
| 330489 ||  || — || April 15, 2007 || Kitt Peak || Spacewatch || — || align=right | 2.6 km || 
|-id=490 bgcolor=#d6d6d6
| 330490 ||  || — || April 15, 2007 || Catalina || CSS || — || align=right | 4.6 km || 
|-id=491 bgcolor=#d6d6d6
| 330491 ||  || — || April 14, 2007 || Kitt Peak || Spacewatch || EOS || align=right | 2.0 km || 
|-id=492 bgcolor=#E9E9E9
| 330492 ||  || — || April 16, 2007 || Socorro || LINEAR || ADE || align=right | 2.3 km || 
|-id=493 bgcolor=#d6d6d6
| 330493 ||  || — || April 15, 2007 || Kitt Peak || Spacewatch || — || align=right | 2.4 km || 
|-id=494 bgcolor=#E9E9E9
| 330494 ||  || — || April 16, 2007 || Mount Lemmon || Mount Lemmon Survey || — || align=right | 1.8 km || 
|-id=495 bgcolor=#d6d6d6
| 330495 ||  || — || April 18, 2007 || Kitt Peak || Spacewatch || — || align=right | 2.3 km || 
|-id=496 bgcolor=#d6d6d6
| 330496 ||  || — || April 22, 2007 || Kitt Peak || Spacewatch || EOS || align=right | 2.4 km || 
|-id=497 bgcolor=#d6d6d6
| 330497 ||  || — || April 25, 2007 || Kitt Peak || Spacewatch || — || align=right | 2.3 km || 
|-id=498 bgcolor=#E9E9E9
| 330498 ||  || — || May 18, 2007 || Tiki || S. F. Hönig, N. Teamo || — || align=right | 2.9 km || 
|-id=499 bgcolor=#d6d6d6
| 330499 ||  || — || June 8, 2007 || Kitt Peak || Spacewatch || — || align=right | 2.9 km || 
|-id=500 bgcolor=#d6d6d6
| 330500 ||  || — || June 9, 2007 || Kitt Peak || Spacewatch || — || align=right | 2.7 km || 
|}

330501–330600 

|-bgcolor=#d6d6d6
| 330501 ||  || — || June 10, 2007 || Kitt Peak || Spacewatch || — || align=right | 2.8 km || 
|-id=502 bgcolor=#d6d6d6
| 330502 ||  || — || June 10, 2007 || Kitt Peak || Spacewatch || — || align=right | 3.3 km || 
|-id=503 bgcolor=#d6d6d6
| 330503 ||  || — || June 10, 2007 || Kitt Peak || Spacewatch || — || align=right | 3.3 km || 
|-id=504 bgcolor=#d6d6d6
| 330504 ||  || — || June 10, 2007 || Kitt Peak || Spacewatch || EMA || align=right | 4.1 km || 
|-id=505 bgcolor=#d6d6d6
| 330505 ||  || — || June 10, 2007 || Kitt Peak || Spacewatch || — || align=right | 3.3 km || 
|-id=506 bgcolor=#d6d6d6
| 330506 ||  || — || June 9, 2007 || Catalina || CSS || — || align=right | 3.6 km || 
|-id=507 bgcolor=#d6d6d6
| 330507 ||  || — || June 14, 2007 || Kitt Peak || Spacewatch || — || align=right | 3.9 km || 
|-id=508 bgcolor=#d6d6d6
| 330508 ||  || — || June 15, 2007 || Catalina || CSS || — || align=right | 4.2 km || 
|-id=509 bgcolor=#d6d6d6
| 330509 ||  || — || June 18, 2007 || Kitt Peak || Spacewatch || — || align=right | 2.4 km || 
|-id=510 bgcolor=#d6d6d6
| 330510 ||  || — || June 18, 2007 || Kitt Peak || Spacewatch || — || align=right | 4.1 km || 
|-id=511 bgcolor=#d6d6d6
| 330511 ||  || — || July 14, 2007 || Dauban || Chante-Perdrix Obs. || — || align=right | 3.4 km || 
|-id=512 bgcolor=#d6d6d6
| 330512 ||  || — || July 15, 2007 || Črni Vrh || Črni Vrh || — || align=right | 7.1 km || 
|-id=513 bgcolor=#d6d6d6
| 330513 ||  || — || September 12, 2007 || Lulin Observatory || LUSS || EOS || align=right | 2.9 km || 
|-id=514 bgcolor=#d6d6d6
| 330514 ||  || — || September 10, 2007 || Kitt Peak || Spacewatch || SHU3:2 || align=right | 8.3 km || 
|-id=515 bgcolor=#fefefe
| 330515 ||  || — || September 8, 2007 || Siding Spring || SSS || H || align=right | 1.0 km || 
|-id=516 bgcolor=#d6d6d6
| 330516 ||  || — || September 14, 2007 || Anderson Mesa || LONEOS || SHU3:2 || align=right | 7.7 km || 
|-id=517 bgcolor=#d6d6d6
| 330517 ||  || — || September 2, 2007 || Siding Spring || SSS || — || align=right | 4.2 km || 
|-id=518 bgcolor=#fefefe
| 330518 ||  || — || September 18, 2007 || Socorro || LINEAR || FLO || align=right data-sort-value="0.90" | 900 m || 
|-id=519 bgcolor=#fefefe
| 330519 ||  || — || October 4, 2007 || Kitt Peak || Spacewatch || — || align=right data-sort-value="0.65" | 650 m || 
|-id=520 bgcolor=#d6d6d6
| 330520 ||  || — || October 8, 2007 || Catalina || CSS || — || align=right | 3.5 km || 
|-id=521 bgcolor=#fefefe
| 330521 ||  || — || October 7, 2007 || Catalina || CSS || — || align=right data-sort-value="0.66" | 660 m || 
|-id=522 bgcolor=#d6d6d6
| 330522 ||  || — || October 6, 2007 || Kitt Peak || Spacewatch || SHU3:2 || align=right | 6.5 km || 
|-id=523 bgcolor=#d6d6d6
| 330523 ||  || — || October 9, 2007 || Socorro || LINEAR || 3:2 || align=right | 8.5 km || 
|-id=524 bgcolor=#fefefe
| 330524 ||  || — || October 7, 2007 || Kitt Peak || Spacewatch || NYS || align=right data-sort-value="0.71" | 710 m || 
|-id=525 bgcolor=#fefefe
| 330525 ||  || — || October 8, 2007 || Kitt Peak || Spacewatch || — || align=right | 1.0 km || 
|-id=526 bgcolor=#d6d6d6
| 330526 ||  || — || October 8, 2007 || Mount Lemmon || Mount Lemmon Survey || SHU3:2 || align=right | 8.3 km || 
|-id=527 bgcolor=#E9E9E9
| 330527 ||  || — || October 8, 2007 || Mount Lemmon || Mount Lemmon Survey || — || align=right | 1.9 km || 
|-id=528 bgcolor=#d6d6d6
| 330528 ||  || — || October 10, 2007 || Catalina || CSS || HIL3:2 || align=right | 8.2 km || 
|-id=529 bgcolor=#fefefe
| 330529 ||  || — || November 1, 2007 || Mount Lemmon || Mount Lemmon Survey || NYS || align=right data-sort-value="0.75" | 750 m || 
|-id=530 bgcolor=#fefefe
| 330530 ||  || — || November 11, 2007 || Mount Lemmon || Mount Lemmon Survey || — || align=right | 1.1 km || 
|-id=531 bgcolor=#fefefe
| 330531 ||  || — || November 12, 2007 || Catalina || CSS || — || align=right data-sort-value="0.74" | 740 m || 
|-id=532 bgcolor=#fefefe
| 330532 ||  || — || November 18, 2007 || Mount Lemmon || Mount Lemmon Survey || — || align=right data-sort-value="0.60" | 600 m || 
|-id=533 bgcolor=#fefefe
| 330533 ||  || — || December 8, 2007 || La Sagra || OAM Obs. || — || align=right data-sort-value="0.86" | 860 m || 
|-id=534 bgcolor=#fefefe
| 330534 ||  || — || December 15, 2007 || Kitt Peak || Spacewatch || ERI || align=right | 1.4 km || 
|-id=535 bgcolor=#fefefe
| 330535 ||  || — || December 30, 2007 || Catalina || CSS || — || align=right data-sort-value="0.87" | 870 m || 
|-id=536 bgcolor=#fefefe
| 330536 ||  || — || December 30, 2007 || Kitt Peak || Spacewatch || — || align=right data-sort-value="0.70" | 700 m || 
|-id=537 bgcolor=#fefefe
| 330537 ||  || — || December 31, 2007 || Kitt Peak || Spacewatch || FLO || align=right data-sort-value="0.61" | 610 m || 
|-id=538 bgcolor=#fefefe
| 330538 ||  || — || December 31, 2007 || Kitt Peak || Spacewatch || — || align=right data-sort-value="0.81" | 810 m || 
|-id=539 bgcolor=#fefefe
| 330539 ||  || — || December 18, 2007 || Mount Lemmon || Mount Lemmon Survey || — || align=right data-sort-value="0.95" | 950 m || 
|-id=540 bgcolor=#E9E9E9
| 330540 ||  || — || January 7, 2008 || Lulin || LUSS || EUN || align=right | 1.7 km || 
|-id=541 bgcolor=#fefefe
| 330541 ||  || — || January 10, 2008 || Mount Lemmon || Mount Lemmon Survey || — || align=right data-sort-value="0.75" | 750 m || 
|-id=542 bgcolor=#fefefe
| 330542 ||  || — || January 10, 2008 || Mount Lemmon || Mount Lemmon Survey || — || align=right data-sort-value="0.77" | 770 m || 
|-id=543 bgcolor=#fefefe
| 330543 ||  || — || November 8, 2007 || Mount Lemmon || Mount Lemmon Survey || — || align=right data-sort-value="0.87" | 870 m || 
|-id=544 bgcolor=#fefefe
| 330544 ||  || — || January 11, 2008 || Kitt Peak || Spacewatch || FLO || align=right data-sort-value="0.52" | 520 m || 
|-id=545 bgcolor=#fefefe
| 330545 ||  || — || January 11, 2008 || Mount Lemmon || Mount Lemmon Survey || NYS || align=right data-sort-value="0.63" | 630 m || 
|-id=546 bgcolor=#fefefe
| 330546 ||  || — || January 12, 2008 || Mount Lemmon || Mount Lemmon Survey || — || align=right | 1.1 km || 
|-id=547 bgcolor=#fefefe
| 330547 ||  || — || January 1, 2008 || Kitt Peak || Spacewatch || — || align=right data-sort-value="0.79" | 790 m || 
|-id=548 bgcolor=#fefefe
| 330548 ||  || — || November 4, 2007 || Mount Lemmon || Mount Lemmon Survey || — || align=right data-sort-value="0.73" | 730 m || 
|-id=549 bgcolor=#fefefe
| 330549 ||  || — || December 18, 2007 || Mount Lemmon || Mount Lemmon Survey || — || align=right data-sort-value="0.85" | 850 m || 
|-id=550 bgcolor=#fefefe
| 330550 ||  || — || January 14, 2008 || Kitt Peak || Spacewatch || FLO || align=right data-sort-value="0.64" | 640 m || 
|-id=551 bgcolor=#fefefe
| 330551 ||  || — || November 3, 2007 || Mount Lemmon || Mount Lemmon Survey || FLO || align=right data-sort-value="0.59" | 590 m || 
|-id=552 bgcolor=#fefefe
| 330552 ||  || — || January 16, 2008 || Kitt Peak || Spacewatch || NYS || align=right data-sort-value="0.69" | 690 m || 
|-id=553 bgcolor=#fefefe
| 330553 ||  || — || January 28, 2008 || Lulin || LUSS || — || align=right data-sort-value="0.65" | 650 m || 
|-id=554 bgcolor=#E9E9E9
| 330554 ||  || — || January 30, 2008 || Catalina || CSS || CLO || align=right | 3.7 km || 
|-id=555 bgcolor=#fefefe
| 330555 ||  || — || January 11, 2008 || Kitt Peak || Spacewatch || FLO || align=right data-sort-value="0.62" | 620 m || 
|-id=556 bgcolor=#fefefe
| 330556 ||  || — || January 1, 2008 || Kitt Peak || Spacewatch || — || align=right data-sort-value="0.98" | 980 m || 
|-id=557 bgcolor=#fefefe
| 330557 ||  || — || January 30, 2008 || Catalina || CSS || — || align=right data-sort-value="0.86" | 860 m || 
|-id=558 bgcolor=#fefefe
| 330558 ||  || — || January 31, 2008 || Mount Lemmon || Mount Lemmon Survey || — || align=right data-sort-value="0.75" | 750 m || 
|-id=559 bgcolor=#fefefe
| 330559 ||  || — || January 30, 2008 || Catalina || CSS || FLO || align=right data-sort-value="0.61" | 610 m || 
|-id=560 bgcolor=#fefefe
| 330560 ||  || — || October 22, 2003 || Kitt Peak || Spacewatch || — || align=right | 1.1 km || 
|-id=561 bgcolor=#E9E9E9
| 330561 ||  || — || February 6, 2008 || Socorro || LINEAR || BAR || align=right | 1.4 km || 
|-id=562 bgcolor=#fefefe
| 330562 ||  || — || January 16, 2004 || Kitt Peak || Spacewatch || — || align=right data-sort-value="0.75" | 750 m || 
|-id=563 bgcolor=#fefefe
| 330563 ||  || — || February 3, 2008 || Kitt Peak || Spacewatch || MAS || align=right data-sort-value="0.70" | 700 m || 
|-id=564 bgcolor=#fefefe
| 330564 ||  || — || February 7, 2008 || Kitt Peak || Spacewatch || PHO || align=right | 1.3 km || 
|-id=565 bgcolor=#fefefe
| 330565 ||  || — || February 1, 2008 || Kitt Peak || Spacewatch || NYS || align=right data-sort-value="0.63" | 630 m || 
|-id=566 bgcolor=#fefefe
| 330566 ||  || — || February 2, 2008 || Kitt Peak || Spacewatch || — || align=right data-sort-value="0.94" | 940 m || 
|-id=567 bgcolor=#fefefe
| 330567 ||  || — || February 2, 2008 || Kitt Peak || Spacewatch || — || align=right data-sort-value="0.76" | 760 m || 
|-id=568 bgcolor=#fefefe
| 330568 ||  || — || February 2, 2008 || Kitt Peak || Spacewatch || — || align=right data-sort-value="0.85" | 850 m || 
|-id=569 bgcolor=#fefefe
| 330569 ||  || — || February 2, 2008 || Kitt Peak || Spacewatch || — || align=right data-sort-value="0.94" | 940 m || 
|-id=570 bgcolor=#fefefe
| 330570 ||  || — || February 3, 2008 || Kitt Peak || Spacewatch || — || align=right data-sort-value="0.99" | 990 m || 
|-id=571 bgcolor=#fefefe
| 330571 ||  || — || February 3, 2008 || Catalina || CSS || — || align=right | 1.0 km || 
|-id=572 bgcolor=#fefefe
| 330572 ||  || — || February 6, 2008 || Catalina || CSS || — || align=right data-sort-value="0.89" | 890 m || 
|-id=573 bgcolor=#E9E9E9
| 330573 ||  || — || February 8, 2008 || Kitt Peak || Spacewatch || — || align=right | 4.2 km || 
|-id=574 bgcolor=#fefefe
| 330574 ||  || — || February 7, 2008 || Bergisch Gladbac || W. Bickel || FLO || align=right data-sort-value="0.56" | 560 m || 
|-id=575 bgcolor=#fefefe
| 330575 ||  || — || February 7, 2008 || Kitt Peak || Spacewatch || NYS || align=right data-sort-value="0.58" | 580 m || 
|-id=576 bgcolor=#fefefe
| 330576 ||  || — || February 3, 2008 || Kitt Peak || Spacewatch || ERI || align=right | 1.9 km || 
|-id=577 bgcolor=#fefefe
| 330577 ||  || — || February 7, 2008 || Kitt Peak || Spacewatch || NYS || align=right data-sort-value="0.76" | 760 m || 
|-id=578 bgcolor=#fefefe
| 330578 ||  || — || February 7, 2008 || Mount Lemmon || Mount Lemmon Survey || NYS || align=right data-sort-value="0.84" | 840 m || 
|-id=579 bgcolor=#fefefe
| 330579 ||  || — || February 8, 2008 || Catalina || CSS || FLO || align=right data-sort-value="0.59" | 590 m || 
|-id=580 bgcolor=#fefefe
| 330580 ||  || — || February 8, 2008 || Kitt Peak || Spacewatch || — || align=right data-sort-value="0.79" | 790 m || 
|-id=581 bgcolor=#fefefe
| 330581 ||  || — || February 9, 2008 || Catalina || CSS || ERI || align=right | 1.4 km || 
|-id=582 bgcolor=#fefefe
| 330582 ||  || — || February 9, 2008 || Kitt Peak || Spacewatch || — || align=right | 1.0 km || 
|-id=583 bgcolor=#fefefe
| 330583 ||  || — || February 6, 2008 || Catalina || CSS || V || align=right data-sort-value="0.83" | 830 m || 
|-id=584 bgcolor=#fefefe
| 330584 ||  || — || February 7, 2008 || Mount Lemmon || Mount Lemmon Survey || — || align=right data-sort-value="0.73" | 730 m || 
|-id=585 bgcolor=#fefefe
| 330585 ||  || — || February 8, 2008 || Kitt Peak || Spacewatch || — || align=right | 1.0 km || 
|-id=586 bgcolor=#fefefe
| 330586 ||  || — || January 15, 2008 || Mount Lemmon || Mount Lemmon Survey || V || align=right data-sort-value="0.71" | 710 m || 
|-id=587 bgcolor=#fefefe
| 330587 ||  || — || February 9, 2008 || Kitt Peak || Spacewatch || ERI || align=right | 1.7 km || 
|-id=588 bgcolor=#fefefe
| 330588 ||  || — || February 9, 2008 || Kitt Peak || Spacewatch || — || align=right data-sort-value="0.91" | 910 m || 
|-id=589 bgcolor=#fefefe
| 330589 ||  || — || February 2, 2008 || Kitt Peak || Spacewatch || — || align=right data-sort-value="0.90" | 900 m || 
|-id=590 bgcolor=#fefefe
| 330590 ||  || — || February 9, 2008 || Kitt Peak || Spacewatch || — || align=right data-sort-value="0.94" | 940 m || 
|-id=591 bgcolor=#fefefe
| 330591 ||  || — || February 9, 2008 || Catalina || CSS || FLO || align=right data-sort-value="0.73" | 730 m || 
|-id=592 bgcolor=#fefefe
| 330592 ||  || — || February 10, 2008 || Anderson Mesa || LONEOS || FLO || align=right data-sort-value="0.80" | 800 m || 
|-id=593 bgcolor=#E9E9E9
| 330593 ||  || — || February 13, 2008 || Catalina || CSS || — || align=right | 2.3 km || 
|-id=594 bgcolor=#fefefe
| 330594 ||  || — || February 7, 2008 || Mount Lemmon || Mount Lemmon Survey || — || align=right data-sort-value="0.64" | 640 m || 
|-id=595 bgcolor=#fefefe
| 330595 ||  || — || February 6, 2008 || Catalina || CSS || — || align=right | 1.1 km || 
|-id=596 bgcolor=#fefefe
| 330596 ||  || — || February 24, 2008 || Kitt Peak || Spacewatch || FLO || align=right data-sort-value="0.59" | 590 m || 
|-id=597 bgcolor=#fefefe
| 330597 ||  || — || February 24, 2008 || Mount Lemmon || Mount Lemmon Survey || NYS || align=right data-sort-value="0.58" | 580 m || 
|-id=598 bgcolor=#fefefe
| 330598 ||  || — || February 26, 2008 || Kitt Peak || Spacewatch || — || align=right data-sort-value="0.82" | 820 m || 
|-id=599 bgcolor=#fefefe
| 330599 ||  || — || February 27, 2008 || Catalina || CSS || — || align=right | 1.0 km || 
|-id=600 bgcolor=#fefefe
| 330600 ||  || — || February 24, 2008 || Kitt Peak || Spacewatch || V || align=right data-sort-value="0.73" | 730 m || 
|}

330601–330700 

|-bgcolor=#fefefe
| 330601 ||  || — || January 15, 2008 || Mount Lemmon || Mount Lemmon Survey || — || align=right data-sort-value="0.87" | 870 m || 
|-id=602 bgcolor=#fefefe
| 330602 ||  || — || February 27, 2008 || Kitt Peak || Spacewatch || FLO || align=right data-sort-value="0.67" | 670 m || 
|-id=603 bgcolor=#fefefe
| 330603 ||  || — || February 27, 2008 || Kitt Peak || Spacewatch || NYS || align=right data-sort-value="0.76" | 760 m || 
|-id=604 bgcolor=#fefefe
| 330604 ||  || — || February 11, 2008 || Mount Lemmon || Mount Lemmon Survey || — || align=right data-sort-value="0.75" | 750 m || 
|-id=605 bgcolor=#fefefe
| 330605 ||  || — || February 27, 2008 || Catalina || CSS || — || align=right | 1.1 km || 
|-id=606 bgcolor=#fefefe
| 330606 ||  || — || February 28, 2008 || Mount Lemmon || Mount Lemmon Survey || MAS || align=right data-sort-value="0.94" | 940 m || 
|-id=607 bgcolor=#fefefe
| 330607 ||  || — || February 26, 2008 || Anderson Mesa || LONEOS || — || align=right data-sort-value="0.80" | 800 m || 
|-id=608 bgcolor=#fefefe
| 330608 ||  || — || February 28, 2008 || Mount Lemmon || Mount Lemmon Survey || V || align=right data-sort-value="0.67" | 670 m || 
|-id=609 bgcolor=#fefefe
| 330609 ||  || — || February 29, 2008 || Kitt Peak || Spacewatch || FLO || align=right data-sort-value="0.90" | 900 m || 
|-id=610 bgcolor=#fefefe
| 330610 ||  || — || February 28, 2008 || Catalina || CSS || — || align=right | 1.0 km || 
|-id=611 bgcolor=#fefefe
| 330611 ||  || — || May 24, 2001 || Cerro Tololo || M. W. Buie || MAS || align=right data-sort-value="0.65" | 650 m || 
|-id=612 bgcolor=#fefefe
| 330612 ||  || — || February 27, 2008 || Catalina || CSS || FLO || align=right data-sort-value="0.82" | 820 m || 
|-id=613 bgcolor=#fefefe
| 330613 ||  || — || February 18, 2008 || Mount Lemmon || Mount Lemmon Survey || NYS || align=right data-sort-value="0.69" | 690 m || 
|-id=614 bgcolor=#fefefe
| 330614 ||  || — || February 27, 2008 || Kitt Peak || Spacewatch || MAS || align=right data-sort-value="0.76" | 760 m || 
|-id=615 bgcolor=#fefefe
| 330615 ||  || — || February 28, 2008 || Kitt Peak || Spacewatch || NYS || align=right data-sort-value="0.51" | 510 m || 
|-id=616 bgcolor=#fefefe
| 330616 ||  || — || February 28, 2008 || Kitt Peak || Spacewatch || MAS || align=right data-sort-value="0.78" | 780 m || 
|-id=617 bgcolor=#fefefe
| 330617 ||  || — || February 26, 2008 || Kitt Peak || Spacewatch || FLO || align=right data-sort-value="0.87" | 870 m || 
|-id=618 bgcolor=#fefefe
| 330618 ||  || — || March 2, 2008 || Mount Lemmon || Mount Lemmon Survey || V || align=right data-sort-value="0.71" | 710 m || 
|-id=619 bgcolor=#fefefe
| 330619 ||  || — || March 1, 2008 || La Sagra || OAM Obs. || NYS || align=right data-sort-value="0.96" | 960 m || 
|-id=620 bgcolor=#fefefe
| 330620 ||  || — || February 3, 2008 || Kitt Peak || Spacewatch || — || align=right data-sort-value="0.92" | 920 m || 
|-id=621 bgcolor=#fefefe
| 330621 ||  || — || March 2, 2008 || Catalina || CSS || — || align=right data-sort-value="0.75" | 750 m || 
|-id=622 bgcolor=#fefefe
| 330622 ||  || — || March 4, 2008 || Kitt Peak || Spacewatch || — || align=right data-sort-value="0.89" | 890 m || 
|-id=623 bgcolor=#fefefe
| 330623 ||  || — || March 1, 2008 || Mount Lemmon || Mount Lemmon Survey || — || align=right data-sort-value="0.80" | 800 m || 
|-id=624 bgcolor=#fefefe
| 330624 ||  || — || March 2, 2008 || Catalina || CSS || — || align=right data-sort-value="0.78" | 780 m || 
|-id=625 bgcolor=#E9E9E9
| 330625 ||  || — || March 4, 2008 || Kitt Peak || Spacewatch || HOF || align=right | 4.0 km || 
|-id=626 bgcolor=#fefefe
| 330626 ||  || — || March 6, 2008 || Kitt Peak || Spacewatch || — || align=right | 1.0 km || 
|-id=627 bgcolor=#fefefe
| 330627 ||  || — || March 7, 2008 || Kitt Peak || Spacewatch || — || align=right | 1.2 km || 
|-id=628 bgcolor=#fefefe
| 330628 ||  || — || March 7, 2008 || Kitt Peak || Spacewatch || — || align=right data-sort-value="0.99" | 990 m || 
|-id=629 bgcolor=#fefefe
| 330629 ||  || — || March 7, 2008 || Kitt Peak || Spacewatch || NYS || align=right data-sort-value="0.71" | 710 m || 
|-id=630 bgcolor=#fefefe
| 330630 ||  || — || March 7, 2008 || Kitt Peak || Spacewatch || NYS || align=right data-sort-value="0.65" | 650 m || 
|-id=631 bgcolor=#fefefe
| 330631 ||  || — || December 18, 2007 || Mount Lemmon || Mount Lemmon Survey || — || align=right | 1.0 km || 
|-id=632 bgcolor=#fefefe
| 330632 ||  || — || March 8, 2008 || Mount Lemmon || Mount Lemmon Survey || NYS || align=right data-sort-value="0.71" | 710 m || 
|-id=633 bgcolor=#d6d6d6
| 330633 ||  || — || March 9, 2008 || Kitt Peak || Spacewatch || EOS || align=right | 2.4 km || 
|-id=634 bgcolor=#fefefe
| 330634 Boico ||  ||  || March 11, 2008 || La Silla || EURONEAR || SUL || align=right | 1.8 km || 
|-id=635 bgcolor=#fefefe
| 330635 ||  || — || March 11, 2008 || Kitt Peak || Spacewatch || — || align=right data-sort-value="0.80" | 800 m || 
|-id=636 bgcolor=#fefefe
| 330636 ||  || — || March 1, 2008 || Kitt Peak || Spacewatch || V || align=right data-sort-value="0.74" | 740 m || 
|-id=637 bgcolor=#fefefe
| 330637 ||  || — || March 10, 2008 || Kitt Peak || Spacewatch || V || align=right data-sort-value="0.57" | 570 m || 
|-id=638 bgcolor=#fefefe
| 330638 ||  || — || July 31, 2005 || Palomar || NEAT || — || align=right data-sort-value="0.97" | 970 m || 
|-id=639 bgcolor=#fefefe
| 330639 ||  || — || February 13, 2008 || Kitt Peak || Spacewatch || — || align=right data-sort-value="0.83" | 830 m || 
|-id=640 bgcolor=#fefefe
| 330640 Yangxuejun ||  ||  || March 3, 2008 || XuYi || PMO NEO || — || align=right data-sort-value="0.73" | 730 m || 
|-id=641 bgcolor=#fefefe
| 330641 ||  || — || March 27, 2008 || Kitt Peak || Spacewatch || — || align=right data-sort-value="0.70" | 700 m || 
|-id=642 bgcolor=#d6d6d6
| 330642 ||  || — || March 28, 2008 || Kitt Peak || Spacewatch || — || align=right | 2.3 km || 
|-id=643 bgcolor=#E9E9E9
| 330643 ||  || — || March 28, 2008 || Kitt Peak || Spacewatch || NEM || align=right | 2.4 km || 
|-id=644 bgcolor=#fefefe
| 330644 ||  || — || March 28, 2008 || Kitt Peak || Spacewatch || — || align=right | 1.1 km || 
|-id=645 bgcolor=#fefefe
| 330645 ||  || — || March 28, 2008 || Kitt Peak || Spacewatch || MAS || align=right data-sort-value="0.92" | 920 m || 
|-id=646 bgcolor=#fefefe
| 330646 ||  || — || March 28, 2008 || Kitt Peak || Spacewatch || — || align=right data-sort-value="0.95" | 950 m || 
|-id=647 bgcolor=#fefefe
| 330647 ||  || — || March 28, 2008 || Mount Lemmon || Mount Lemmon Survey || MAS || align=right data-sort-value="0.99" | 990 m || 
|-id=648 bgcolor=#fefefe
| 330648 ||  || — || March 28, 2008 || Mount Lemmon || Mount Lemmon Survey || CLA || align=right | 2.2 km || 
|-id=649 bgcolor=#E9E9E9
| 330649 ||  || — || March 29, 2008 || Mount Lemmon || Mount Lemmon Survey || — || align=right | 1.1 km || 
|-id=650 bgcolor=#fefefe
| 330650 ||  || — || March 27, 2008 || Mount Lemmon || Mount Lemmon Survey || — || align=right data-sort-value="0.65" | 650 m || 
|-id=651 bgcolor=#fefefe
| 330651 ||  || — || March 28, 2008 || Mount Lemmon || Mount Lemmon Survey || NYS || align=right data-sort-value="0.53" | 530 m || 
|-id=652 bgcolor=#fefefe
| 330652 ||  || — || March 28, 2008 || Mount Lemmon || Mount Lemmon Survey || MAS || align=right data-sort-value="0.96" | 960 m || 
|-id=653 bgcolor=#fefefe
| 330653 ||  || — || March 31, 2008 || Mount Lemmon || Mount Lemmon Survey || — || align=right data-sort-value="0.71" | 710 m || 
|-id=654 bgcolor=#fefefe
| 330654 ||  || — || March 31, 2008 || Kitt Peak || Spacewatch || critical || align=right data-sort-value="0.65" | 650 m || 
|-id=655 bgcolor=#fefefe
| 330655 ||  || — || March 31, 2008 || Kitt Peak || Spacewatch || — || align=right data-sort-value="0.98" | 980 m || 
|-id=656 bgcolor=#fefefe
| 330656 ||  || — || March 31, 2008 || Mount Lemmon || Mount Lemmon Survey || MAS || align=right data-sort-value="0.76" | 760 m || 
|-id=657 bgcolor=#fefefe
| 330657 ||  || — || March 28, 2008 || Mount Lemmon || Mount Lemmon Survey || — || align=right data-sort-value="0.79" | 790 m || 
|-id=658 bgcolor=#fefefe
| 330658 ||  || — || March 26, 2008 || Mount Lemmon || Mount Lemmon Survey || NYS || align=right data-sort-value="0.69" | 690 m || 
|-id=659 bgcolor=#FFC2E0
| 330659 ||  || — || April 5, 2008 || Socorro || LINEAR || AMO || align=right data-sort-value="0.095" | 95 m || 
|-id=660 bgcolor=#E9E9E9
| 330660 ||  || — || April 5, 2008 || Catalina || CSS || — || align=right | 1.9 km || 
|-id=661 bgcolor=#fefefe
| 330661 ||  || — || April 7, 2008 || Kitt Peak || Spacewatch || — || align=right | 2.3 km || 
|-id=662 bgcolor=#E9E9E9
| 330662 ||  || — || April 7, 2008 || Mount Lemmon || Mount Lemmon Survey || — || align=right | 1.6 km || 
|-id=663 bgcolor=#fefefe
| 330663 ||  || — || April 7, 2008 || Mount Lemmon || Mount Lemmon Survey || V || align=right data-sort-value="0.64" | 640 m || 
|-id=664 bgcolor=#fefefe
| 330664 ||  || — || April 8, 2008 || Kitt Peak || Spacewatch || V || align=right data-sort-value="0.86" | 860 m || 
|-id=665 bgcolor=#E9E9E9
| 330665 ||  || — || April 5, 2008 || Mount Lemmon || Mount Lemmon Survey || — || align=right | 2.4 km || 
|-id=666 bgcolor=#E9E9E9
| 330666 ||  || — || April 6, 2008 || Mount Lemmon || Mount Lemmon Survey || — || align=right data-sort-value="0.77" | 770 m || 
|-id=667 bgcolor=#fefefe
| 330667 ||  || — || April 8, 2008 || Kitt Peak || Spacewatch || — || align=right | 1.2 km || 
|-id=668 bgcolor=#fefefe
| 330668 ||  || — || September 30, 2006 || Mount Lemmon || Mount Lemmon Survey || — || align=right data-sort-value="0.93" | 930 m || 
|-id=669 bgcolor=#E9E9E9
| 330669 ||  || — || April 9, 2008 || Kitt Peak || Spacewatch || — || align=right data-sort-value="0.84" | 840 m || 
|-id=670 bgcolor=#fefefe
| 330670 ||  || — || November 24, 2006 || Mount Lemmon || Mount Lemmon Survey || MAS || align=right data-sort-value="0.78" | 780 m || 
|-id=671 bgcolor=#E9E9E9
| 330671 ||  || — || April 6, 2008 || Mount Lemmon || Mount Lemmon Survey || — || align=right | 1.5 km || 
|-id=672 bgcolor=#fefefe
| 330672 ||  || — || April 8, 2008 || Kitt Peak || Spacewatch || V || align=right data-sort-value="0.93" | 930 m || 
|-id=673 bgcolor=#E9E9E9
| 330673 ||  || — || April 6, 2008 || Kitt Peak || Spacewatch || — || align=right | 1.1 km || 
|-id=674 bgcolor=#fefefe
| 330674 ||  || — || April 4, 2008 || Mount Lemmon || Mount Lemmon Survey || — || align=right | 1.1 km || 
|-id=675 bgcolor=#E9E9E9
| 330675 ||  || — || April 28, 2008 || La Sagra || OAM Obs. || — || align=right | 1.3 km || 
|-id=676 bgcolor=#fefefe
| 330676 ||  || — || April 24, 2008 || Kitt Peak || Spacewatch || NYS || align=right data-sort-value="0.61" | 610 m || 
|-id=677 bgcolor=#fefefe
| 330677 ||  || — || April 24, 2008 || Kitt Peak || Spacewatch || MAS || align=right data-sort-value="0.90" | 900 m || 
|-id=678 bgcolor=#E9E9E9
| 330678 ||  || — || April 1, 2008 || Mount Lemmon || Mount Lemmon Survey || — || align=right | 1.5 km || 
|-id=679 bgcolor=#E9E9E9
| 330679 ||  || — || April 27, 2008 || Kitt Peak || Spacewatch || AST || align=right | 1.6 km || 
|-id=680 bgcolor=#fefefe
| 330680 ||  || — || April 6, 2008 || Kitt Peak || Spacewatch || — || align=right | 1.1 km || 
|-id=681 bgcolor=#E9E9E9
| 330681 ||  || — || April 30, 2008 || Mount Lemmon || Mount Lemmon Survey || — || align=right | 1.3 km || 
|-id=682 bgcolor=#E9E9E9
| 330682 ||  || — || March 10, 2008 || Kitt Peak || Spacewatch || — || align=right | 1.9 km || 
|-id=683 bgcolor=#fefefe
| 330683 ||  || — || April 26, 2008 || Mount Lemmon || Mount Lemmon Survey || NYS || align=right data-sort-value="0.65" | 650 m || 
|-id=684 bgcolor=#fefefe
| 330684 ||  || — || April 28, 2008 || Kitt Peak || Spacewatch || NYS || align=right data-sort-value="0.77" | 770 m || 
|-id=685 bgcolor=#fefefe
| 330685 ||  || — || April 3, 2008 || Kitt Peak || Spacewatch || MAS || align=right data-sort-value="0.69" | 690 m || 
|-id=686 bgcolor=#E9E9E9
| 330686 ||  || — || April 30, 2008 || Kitt Peak || Spacewatch || — || align=right | 1.2 km || 
|-id=687 bgcolor=#E9E9E9
| 330687 ||  || — || April 25, 2008 || Kitt Peak || Spacewatch || — || align=right | 1.2 km || 
|-id=688 bgcolor=#d6d6d6
| 330688 ||  || — || April 29, 2008 || Mount Lemmon || Mount Lemmon Survey || THM || align=right | 2.5 km || 
|-id=689 bgcolor=#fefefe
| 330689 ||  || — || May 2, 2008 || Mount Lemmon || Mount Lemmon Survey || NYS || align=right data-sort-value="0.57" | 570 m || 
|-id=690 bgcolor=#fefefe
| 330690 ||  || — || May 3, 2008 || Dauban || F. Kugel || — || align=right | 1.1 km || 
|-id=691 bgcolor=#E9E9E9
| 330691 ||  || — || May 3, 2008 || Kitt Peak || Spacewatch || — || align=right | 1.9 km || 
|-id=692 bgcolor=#E9E9E9
| 330692 ||  || — || May 7, 2008 || Kitt Peak || Spacewatch || — || align=right data-sort-value="0.94" | 940 m || 
|-id=693 bgcolor=#E9E9E9
| 330693 ||  || — || May 8, 2008 || Kitt Peak || Spacewatch || — || align=right | 1.3 km || 
|-id=694 bgcolor=#fefefe
| 330694 ||  || — || May 8, 2008 || Kitt Peak || Spacewatch || V || align=right data-sort-value="0.71" | 710 m || 
|-id=695 bgcolor=#E9E9E9
| 330695 ||  || — || May 26, 2008 || Kitt Peak || Spacewatch || — || align=right | 1.9 km || 
|-id=696 bgcolor=#E9E9E9
| 330696 ||  || — || May 27, 2008 || Kitt Peak || Spacewatch || — || align=right | 1.1 km || 
|-id=697 bgcolor=#E9E9E9
| 330697 ||  || — || May 29, 2008 || Wrightwood || J. W. Young || MIT || align=right | 3.5 km || 
|-id=698 bgcolor=#E9E9E9
| 330698 ||  || — || May 27, 2008 || Kitt Peak || Spacewatch || — || align=right | 2.0 km || 
|-id=699 bgcolor=#E9E9E9
| 330699 ||  || — || May 27, 2008 || Kitt Peak || Spacewatch || — || align=right | 1.6 km || 
|-id=700 bgcolor=#E9E9E9
| 330700 ||  || — || May 28, 2008 || Kitt Peak || Spacewatch || — || align=right data-sort-value="0.97" | 970 m || 
|}

330701–330800 

|-bgcolor=#E9E9E9
| 330701 ||  || — || May 29, 2008 || Kitt Peak || Spacewatch || — || align=right | 1.5 km || 
|-id=702 bgcolor=#E9E9E9
| 330702 ||  || — || June 3, 2008 || Mount Lemmon || Mount Lemmon Survey || — || align=right | 3.5 km || 
|-id=703 bgcolor=#E9E9E9
| 330703 ||  || — || June 6, 2008 || Kitt Peak || Spacewatch || — || align=right | 1.3 km || 
|-id=704 bgcolor=#E9E9E9
| 330704 ||  || — || June 7, 2008 || Catalina || CSS || CLO || align=right | 2.8 km || 
|-id=705 bgcolor=#E9E9E9
| 330705 ||  || — || June 9, 2008 || Kitt Peak || Spacewatch || — || align=right | 1.0 km || 
|-id=706 bgcolor=#E9E9E9
| 330706 ||  || — || June 27, 2008 || Siding Spring || SSS || — || align=right | 2.0 km || 
|-id=707 bgcolor=#E9E9E9
| 330707 ||  || — || July 3, 2008 || Siding Spring || SSS || — || align=right | 2.7 km || 
|-id=708 bgcolor=#E9E9E9
| 330708 ||  || — || July 25, 2008 || La Sagra || OAM Obs. || JUN || align=right | 1.4 km || 
|-id=709 bgcolor=#E9E9E9
| 330709 ||  || — || July 28, 2008 || La Sagra || OAM Obs. || — || align=right | 3.6 km || 
|-id=710 bgcolor=#E9E9E9
| 330710 ||  || — || September 18, 2004 || Socorro || LINEAR || — || align=right | 1.9 km || 
|-id=711 bgcolor=#E9E9E9
| 330711 ||  || — || December 24, 2005 || Kitt Peak || Spacewatch || — || align=right | 2.8 km || 
|-id=712 bgcolor=#d6d6d6
| 330712 Rhodescolossus ||  ||  || August 3, 2008 || Vallemare di Borbona || V. S. Casulli || — || align=right | 2.4 km || 
|-id=713 bgcolor=#E9E9E9
| 330713 ||  || — || August 5, 2008 || La Sagra || OAM Obs. || — || align=right | 2.9 km || 
|-id=714 bgcolor=#d6d6d6
| 330714 ||  || — || August 5, 2008 || La Sagra || OAM Obs. || BRA || align=right | 1.9 km || 
|-id=715 bgcolor=#E9E9E9
| 330715 ||  || — || August 10, 2008 || Dauban || F. Kugel || — || align=right | 3.4 km || 
|-id=716 bgcolor=#d6d6d6
| 330716 ||  || — || August 5, 2008 || Siding Spring || SSS || BRA || align=right | 2.2 km || 
|-id=717 bgcolor=#E9E9E9
| 330717 ||  || — || August 2, 2008 || Siding Spring || SSS || — || align=right | 3.1 km || 
|-id=718 bgcolor=#E9E9E9
| 330718 ||  || — || August 20, 2008 || Kitt Peak || Spacewatch || — || align=right | 2.7 km || 
|-id=719 bgcolor=#d6d6d6
| 330719 ||  || — || July 28, 2008 || Mount Lemmon || Mount Lemmon Survey || URS || align=right | 4.1 km || 
|-id=720 bgcolor=#d6d6d6
| 330720 ||  || — || August 30, 2008 || Bergisch Gladbac || W. Bickel || — || align=right | 2.8 km || 
|-id=721 bgcolor=#d6d6d6
| 330721 ||  || — || August 29, 2008 || La Sagra || OAM Obs. || — || align=right | 2.9 km || 
|-id=722 bgcolor=#E9E9E9
| 330722 ||  || — || August 24, 2008 || La Sagra || OAM Obs. || — || align=right | 2.9 km || 
|-id=723 bgcolor=#d6d6d6
| 330723 ||  || — || August 23, 2008 || Siding Spring || SSS || 629 || align=right | 2.2 km || 
|-id=724 bgcolor=#d6d6d6
| 330724 ||  || — || August 21, 2008 || Kitt Peak || Spacewatch || — || align=right | 2.5 km || 
|-id=725 bgcolor=#d6d6d6
| 330725 ||  || — || September 3, 2008 || La Sagra || OAM Obs. || — || align=right | 3.6 km || 
|-id=726 bgcolor=#d6d6d6
| 330726 ||  || — || September 2, 2008 || Kitt Peak || Spacewatch || — || align=right | 2.9 km || 
|-id=727 bgcolor=#d6d6d6
| 330727 ||  || — || September 6, 2008 || Catalina || CSS || — || align=right | 2.6 km || 
|-id=728 bgcolor=#d6d6d6
| 330728 ||  || — || September 6, 2008 || Mount Lemmon || Mount Lemmon Survey || — || align=right | 4.0 km || 
|-id=729 bgcolor=#d6d6d6
| 330729 ||  || — || September 7, 2008 || Catalina || CSS || — || align=right | 3.1 km || 
|-id=730 bgcolor=#d6d6d6
| 330730 ||  || — || September 5, 2008 || Kitt Peak || Spacewatch || — || align=right | 3.9 km || 
|-id=731 bgcolor=#d6d6d6
| 330731 ||  || — || September 5, 2008 || Kitt Peak || Spacewatch || EOS || align=right | 2.1 km || 
|-id=732 bgcolor=#d6d6d6
| 330732 ||  || — || September 4, 2008 || Kitt Peak || Spacewatch || — || align=right | 3.5 km || 
|-id=733 bgcolor=#d6d6d6
| 330733 ||  || — || September 4, 2008 || Kitt Peak || Spacewatch || — || align=right | 3.8 km || 
|-id=734 bgcolor=#E9E9E9
| 330734 ||  || — || February 8, 2002 || Kitt Peak || M. W. Buie || KON || align=right | 2.5 km || 
|-id=735 bgcolor=#d6d6d6
| 330735 ||  || — || September 4, 2008 || Kitt Peak || Spacewatch || — || align=right | 2.7 km || 
|-id=736 bgcolor=#d6d6d6
| 330736 ||  || — || September 19, 2008 || Kitt Peak || Spacewatch || — || align=right | 2.5 km || 
|-id=737 bgcolor=#d6d6d6
| 330737 ||  || — || August 22, 2008 || Kitt Peak || Spacewatch || — || align=right | 3.1 km || 
|-id=738 bgcolor=#d6d6d6
| 330738 ||  || — || September 4, 2008 || Kitt Peak || Spacewatch || HYG || align=right | 2.7 km || 
|-id=739 bgcolor=#d6d6d6
| 330739 ||  || — || September 20, 2008 || Kitt Peak || Spacewatch || — || align=right | 4.7 km || 
|-id=740 bgcolor=#d6d6d6
| 330740 ||  || — || September 20, 2008 || Kitt Peak || Spacewatch || — || align=right | 3.9 km || 
|-id=741 bgcolor=#d6d6d6
| 330741 ||  || — || September 20, 2008 || Kitt Peak || Spacewatch || HYG || align=right | 2.7 km || 
|-id=742 bgcolor=#d6d6d6
| 330742 ||  || — || September 21, 2008 || Mount Lemmon || Mount Lemmon Survey || — || align=right | 4.3 km || 
|-id=743 bgcolor=#d6d6d6
| 330743 ||  || — || September 20, 2008 || Kitt Peak || Spacewatch || — || align=right | 4.4 km || 
|-id=744 bgcolor=#E9E9E9
| 330744 ||  || — || September 21, 2008 || Kitt Peak || Spacewatch || — || align=right | 3.2 km || 
|-id=745 bgcolor=#d6d6d6
| 330745 ||  || — || September 22, 2008 || Kitt Peak || Spacewatch || VER || align=right | 4.6 km || 
|-id=746 bgcolor=#d6d6d6
| 330746 ||  || — || September 22, 2008 || Kitt Peak || Spacewatch || — || align=right | 3.2 km || 
|-id=747 bgcolor=#d6d6d6
| 330747 ||  || — || September 22, 2008 || Mount Lemmon || Mount Lemmon Survey || — || align=right | 3.3 km || 
|-id=748 bgcolor=#d6d6d6
| 330748 ||  || — || September 22, 2008 || Mount Lemmon || Mount Lemmon Survey || EOS || align=right | 2.2 km || 
|-id=749 bgcolor=#d6d6d6
| 330749 ||  || — || September 22, 2008 || Kitt Peak || Spacewatch || EOS || align=right | 3.1 km || 
|-id=750 bgcolor=#d6d6d6
| 330750 ||  || — || September 23, 2008 || Catalina || CSS || — || align=right | 3.7 km || 
|-id=751 bgcolor=#d6d6d6
| 330751 ||  || — || September 21, 2008 || Bergisch Gladbac || W. Bickel || — || align=right | 6.3 km || 
|-id=752 bgcolor=#d6d6d6
| 330752 ||  || — || September 25, 2008 || Bergisch Gladbac || W. Bickel || EOS || align=right | 2.0 km || 
|-id=753 bgcolor=#d6d6d6
| 330753 ||  || — || September 27, 2008 || Andrushivka || Andrushivka Obs. || — || align=right | 4.9 km || 
|-id=754 bgcolor=#d6d6d6
| 330754 ||  || — || September 28, 2008 || Dauban || F. Kugel || — || align=right | 4.3 km || 
|-id=755 bgcolor=#d6d6d6
| 330755 ||  || — || September 21, 2008 || Mount Lemmon || Mount Lemmon Survey || — || align=right | 3.3 km || 
|-id=756 bgcolor=#d6d6d6
| 330756 ||  || — || October 24, 2003 || Apache Point || SDSS || EOS || align=right | 2.5 km || 
|-id=757 bgcolor=#d6d6d6
| 330757 ||  || — || September 26, 2008 || Mount Lemmon || Mount Lemmon Survey || EOS || align=right | 2.4 km || 
|-id=758 bgcolor=#E9E9E9
| 330758 ||  || — || September 26, 2008 || Kitt Peak || Spacewatch || — || align=right | 2.4 km || 
|-id=759 bgcolor=#C7FF8F
| 330759 ||  || — || September 30, 2008 || Mount Lemmon || Mount Lemmon Survey || damocloidunusualcritical || align=right | 12 km || 
|-id=760 bgcolor=#E9E9E9
| 330760 ||  || — || September 21, 2008 || Siding Spring || SSS || JUN || align=right | 1.5 km || 
|-id=761 bgcolor=#d6d6d6
| 330761 ||  || — || September 21, 2008 || Kitt Peak || Spacewatch || — || align=right | 4.2 km || 
|-id=762 bgcolor=#d6d6d6
| 330762 ||  || — || September 21, 2008 || Catalina || CSS || — || align=right | 4.0 km || 
|-id=763 bgcolor=#E9E9E9
| 330763 ||  || — || September 23, 2008 || Kitt Peak || Spacewatch || WIT || align=right | 1.3 km || 
|-id=764 bgcolor=#d6d6d6
| 330764 ||  || — || September 25, 2008 || Kitt Peak || Spacewatch || 7:4 || align=right | 4.7 km || 
|-id=765 bgcolor=#E9E9E9
| 330765 ||  || — || September 30, 2008 || Mount Lemmon || Mount Lemmon Survey || — || align=right | 3.4 km || 
|-id=766 bgcolor=#E9E9E9
| 330766 ||  || — || September 23, 2008 || Mount Lemmon || Mount Lemmon Survey || AGN || align=right | 1.3 km || 
|-id=767 bgcolor=#d6d6d6
| 330767 ||  || — || September 6, 2008 || Kitt Peak || Spacewatch || — || align=right | 2.5 km || 
|-id=768 bgcolor=#d6d6d6
| 330768 ||  || — || September 28, 2008 || Socorro || LINEAR || — || align=right | 2.7 km || 
|-id=769 bgcolor=#d6d6d6
| 330769 ||  || — || September 28, 2008 || Catalina || CSS || — || align=right | 4.5 km || 
|-id=770 bgcolor=#d6d6d6
| 330770 ||  || — || September 23, 2008 || Socorro || LINEAR || — || align=right | 3.2 km || 
|-id=771 bgcolor=#d6d6d6
| 330771 ||  || — || September 23, 2008 || Socorro || LINEAR || — || align=right | 3.9 km || 
|-id=772 bgcolor=#d6d6d6
| 330772 ||  || — || October 3, 2008 || Pla D'Arguines || Pla D'Arguines Obs. || HYG || align=right | 3.3 km || 
|-id=773 bgcolor=#d6d6d6
| 330773 ||  || — || October 4, 2008 || Črni Vrh || Črni Vrh || HYG || align=right | 3.8 km || 
|-id=774 bgcolor=#E9E9E9
| 330774 ||  || — || October 3, 2008 || La Sagra || OAM Obs. || — || align=right | 2.5 km || 
|-id=775 bgcolor=#d6d6d6
| 330775 ||  || — || October 3, 2008 || La Sagra || OAM Obs. || EUP || align=right | 4.9 km || 
|-id=776 bgcolor=#d6d6d6
| 330776 ||  || — || October 1, 2008 || Kitt Peak || Spacewatch || THM || align=right | 2.9 km || 
|-id=777 bgcolor=#d6d6d6
| 330777 ||  || — || October 1, 2008 || Catalina || CSS || — || align=right | 4.8 km || 
|-id=778 bgcolor=#d6d6d6
| 330778 ||  || — || October 1, 2008 || Mount Lemmon || Mount Lemmon Survey || — || align=right | 2.8 km || 
|-id=779 bgcolor=#d6d6d6
| 330779 ||  || — || October 2, 2008 || Kitt Peak || Spacewatch || — || align=right | 2.5 km || 
|-id=780 bgcolor=#d6d6d6
| 330780 ||  || — || October 2, 2008 || Kitt Peak || Spacewatch || 3:2 || align=right | 5.6 km || 
|-id=781 bgcolor=#d6d6d6
| 330781 ||  || — || October 2, 2008 || Kitt Peak || Spacewatch || — || align=right | 4.0 km || 
|-id=782 bgcolor=#d6d6d6
| 330782 ||  || — || September 9, 2008 || Mount Lemmon || Mount Lemmon Survey || — || align=right | 2.6 km || 
|-id=783 bgcolor=#d6d6d6
| 330783 ||  || — || October 6, 2008 || Mount Lemmon || Mount Lemmon Survey || — || align=right | 3.0 km || 
|-id=784 bgcolor=#d6d6d6
| 330784 ||  || — || October 7, 2008 || Catalina || CSS || — || align=right | 3.1 km || 
|-id=785 bgcolor=#d6d6d6
| 330785 ||  || — || October 10, 2008 || Catalina || CSS || EUP || align=right | 5.9 km || 
|-id=786 bgcolor=#d6d6d6
| 330786 ||  || — || October 1, 2008 || Catalina || CSS || — || align=right | 4.6 km || 
|-id=787 bgcolor=#d6d6d6
| 330787 ||  || — || October 20, 2008 || Mount Lemmon || Mount Lemmon Survey || — || align=right | 2.3 km || 
|-id=788 bgcolor=#d6d6d6
| 330788 ||  || — || October 21, 2008 || Kitt Peak || Spacewatch || 3:2 || align=right | 5.6 km || 
|-id=789 bgcolor=#d6d6d6
| 330789 ||  || — || October 22, 2008 || Kitt Peak || Spacewatch || — || align=right | 4.2 km || 
|-id=790 bgcolor=#d6d6d6
| 330790 ||  || — || October 23, 2008 || Kitt Peak || Spacewatch || HYG || align=right | 2.8 km || 
|-id=791 bgcolor=#d6d6d6
| 330791 ||  || — || October 23, 2008 || Kitt Peak || Spacewatch || HYG || align=right | 4.4 km || 
|-id=792 bgcolor=#d6d6d6
| 330792 ||  || — || October 23, 2008 || Kitt Peak || Spacewatch || — || align=right | 3.5 km || 
|-id=793 bgcolor=#d6d6d6
| 330793 ||  || — || October 24, 2008 || Catalina || CSS || — || align=right | 3.8 km || 
|-id=794 bgcolor=#d6d6d6
| 330794 ||  || — || October 24, 2008 || Kitt Peak || Spacewatch || — || align=right | 5.2 km || 
|-id=795 bgcolor=#d6d6d6
| 330795 ||  || — || October 26, 2008 || Socorro || LINEAR || EOS || align=right | 3.1 km || 
|-id=796 bgcolor=#d6d6d6
| 330796 ||  || — || October 27, 2008 || Catalina || CSS || EUP || align=right | 6.4 km || 
|-id=797 bgcolor=#d6d6d6
| 330797 ||  || — || October 27, 2008 || Mount Lemmon || Mount Lemmon Survey || — || align=right | 5.9 km || 
|-id=798 bgcolor=#d6d6d6
| 330798 ||  || — || February 25, 2006 || Anderson Mesa || LONEOS || — || align=right | 5.2 km || 
|-id=799 bgcolor=#d6d6d6
| 330799 ||  || — || March 26, 2006 || Mount Lemmon || Mount Lemmon Survey || THM || align=right | 3.1 km || 
|-id=800 bgcolor=#d6d6d6
| 330800 ||  || — || October 30, 2008 || Catalina || CSS || — || align=right | 4.0 km || 
|}

330801–330900 

|-bgcolor=#d6d6d6
| 330801 ||  || — || October 30, 2008 || Kitt Peak || Spacewatch || URS || align=right | 4.0 km || 
|-id=802 bgcolor=#d6d6d6
| 330802 ||  || — || October 30, 2008 || Mount Lemmon || Mount Lemmon Survey || — || align=right | 6.0 km || 
|-id=803 bgcolor=#d6d6d6
| 330803 ||  || — || October 31, 2008 || Mount Lemmon || Mount Lemmon Survey || TIR || align=right | 3.7 km || 
|-id=804 bgcolor=#d6d6d6
| 330804 ||  || — || October 20, 2008 || Kitt Peak || Spacewatch || — || align=right | 3.1 km || 
|-id=805 bgcolor=#d6d6d6
| 330805 ||  || — || October 30, 2008 || Kitt Peak || Spacewatch || — || align=right | 3.1 km || 
|-id=806 bgcolor=#E9E9E9
| 330806 ||  || — || October 26, 2008 || Siding Spring || SSS || — || align=right | 1.9 km || 
|-id=807 bgcolor=#d6d6d6
| 330807 ||  || — || October 25, 2008 || Catalina || CSS || — || align=right | 4.5 km || 
|-id=808 bgcolor=#fefefe
| 330808 ||  || — || October 26, 2008 || Mount Lemmon || Mount Lemmon Survey || — || align=right | 1.4 km || 
|-id=809 bgcolor=#FFC2E0
| 330809 ||  || — || November 8, 2008 || Socorro || LINEAR || APO || align=right data-sort-value="0.51" | 510 m || 
|-id=810 bgcolor=#d6d6d6
| 330810 ||  || — || November 1, 2008 || Mount Lemmon || Mount Lemmon Survey || EMA || align=right | 4.9 km || 
|-id=811 bgcolor=#d6d6d6
| 330811 ||  || — || November 2, 2008 || Kitt Peak || Spacewatch || — || align=right | 4.1 km || 
|-id=812 bgcolor=#d6d6d6
| 330812 ||  || — || November 2, 2008 || Mount Lemmon || Mount Lemmon Survey || — || align=right | 3.7 km || 
|-id=813 bgcolor=#d6d6d6
| 330813 ||  || — || November 4, 2008 || Kitt Peak || Spacewatch || SYL7:4 || align=right | 4.5 km || 
|-id=814 bgcolor=#d6d6d6
| 330814 ||  || — || November 6, 2008 || Catalina || CSS || EUP || align=right | 6.3 km || 
|-id=815 bgcolor=#d6d6d6
| 330815 ||  || — || November 2, 2008 || Mount Lemmon || Mount Lemmon Survey || — || align=right | 4.8 km || 
|-id=816 bgcolor=#d6d6d6
| 330816 ||  || — || November 2, 2008 || Catalina || CSS || — || align=right | 4.1 km || 
|-id=817 bgcolor=#d6d6d6
| 330817 || 2008 WH || — || November 18, 2008 || Cordell-Lorenz || D. T. Durig || — || align=right | 3.7 km || 
|-id=818 bgcolor=#d6d6d6
| 330818 ||  || — || November 17, 2008 || Kitt Peak || Spacewatch || — || align=right | 4.9 km || 
|-id=819 bgcolor=#d6d6d6
| 330819 ||  || — || November 18, 2008 || Catalina || CSS || — || align=right | 4.7 km || 
|-id=820 bgcolor=#d6d6d6
| 330820 ||  || — || November 24, 2008 || Mayhill || A. Lowe || ALA || align=right | 6.7 km || 
|-id=821 bgcolor=#d6d6d6
| 330821 ||  || — || November 20, 2008 || Kitt Peak || Spacewatch || HYG || align=right | 4.0 km || 
|-id=822 bgcolor=#d6d6d6
| 330822 ||  || — || November 23, 2008 || Mount Lemmon || Mount Lemmon Survey || 3:2 || align=right | 4.4 km || 
|-id=823 bgcolor=#d6d6d6
| 330823 ||  || — || November 19, 2008 || Catalina || CSS || — || align=right | 5.3 km || 
|-id=824 bgcolor=#d6d6d6
| 330824 ||  || — || November 21, 2008 || Kitt Peak || Spacewatch || ARM || align=right | 6.0 km || 
|-id=825 bgcolor=#FFC2E0
| 330825 ||  || — || December 6, 2008 || Socorro || LINEAR || AMO +1km || align=right | 2.0 km || 
|-id=826 bgcolor=#fefefe
| 330826 ||  || — || January 16, 2009 || Mount Lemmon || Mount Lemmon Survey || — || align=right data-sort-value="0.71" | 710 m || 
|-id=827 bgcolor=#FA8072
| 330827 ||  || — || February 20, 2009 || Kitt Peak || Spacewatch || H || align=right data-sort-value="0.70" | 700 m || 
|-id=828 bgcolor=#FA8072
| 330828 ||  || — || March 14, 2009 || La Sagra || OAM Obs. || H || align=right data-sort-value="0.84" | 840 m || 
|-id=829 bgcolor=#fefefe
| 330829 ||  || — || September 5, 2007 || Catalina || CSS || H || align=right data-sort-value="0.68" | 680 m || 
|-id=830 bgcolor=#fefefe
| 330830 ||  || — || March 16, 2009 || Kitt Peak || Spacewatch || MAS || align=right data-sort-value="0.79" | 790 m || 
|-id=831 bgcolor=#fefefe
| 330831 ||  || — || October 12, 1993 || Kitt Peak || Spacewatch || — || align=right data-sort-value="0.76" | 760 m || 
|-id=832 bgcolor=#fefefe
| 330832 ||  || — || March 25, 2009 || Bisei SG Center || BATTeRS || H || align=right data-sort-value="0.69" | 690 m || 
|-id=833 bgcolor=#E9E9E9
| 330833 ||  || — || December 29, 2003 || Catalina || CSS || MAR || align=right | 1.3 km || 
|-id=834 bgcolor=#fefefe
| 330834 ||  || — || April 20, 2009 || La Sagra || OAM Obs. || H || align=right data-sort-value="0.76" | 760 m || 
|-id=835 bgcolor=#fefefe
| 330835 ||  || — || April 20, 2009 || Kitt Peak || Spacewatch || V || align=right data-sort-value="0.74" | 740 m || 
|-id=836 bgcolor=#C7FF8F
| 330836 Orius ||  ||  || April 25, 2009 || Baldone || K. Černis, I. Eglītis || centaurcritical || align=right | 46 km || 
|-id=837 bgcolor=#fefefe
| 330837 ||  || — || August 15, 2002 || Anderson Mesa || LONEOS || — || align=right data-sort-value="0.83" | 830 m || 
|-id=838 bgcolor=#fefefe
| 330838 ||  || — || July 3, 2009 || La Sagra || OAM Obs. || PHO || align=right | 1.7 km || 
|-id=839 bgcolor=#fefefe
| 330839 ||  || — || July 20, 2009 || La Sagra || OAM Obs. || — || align=right | 1.3 km || 
|-id=840 bgcolor=#fefefe
| 330840 ||  || — || July 25, 2009 || La Sagra || OAM Obs. || — || align=right | 1.8 km || 
|-id=841 bgcolor=#E9E9E9
| 330841 ||  || — || July 27, 2009 || Catalina || CSS || JUN || align=right | 1.1 km || 
|-id=842 bgcolor=#fefefe
| 330842 ||  || — || July 26, 2009 || La Sagra || OAM Obs. || FLO || align=right data-sort-value="0.61" | 610 m || 
|-id=843 bgcolor=#fefefe
| 330843 ||  || — || July 28, 2009 || La Sagra || OAM Obs. || — || align=right data-sort-value="0.95" | 950 m || 
|-id=844 bgcolor=#fefefe
| 330844 ||  || — || October 2, 2003 || Kitt Peak || Spacewatch || — || align=right data-sort-value="0.74" | 740 m || 
|-id=845 bgcolor=#fefefe
| 330845 ||  || — || November 10, 2006 || Kitt Peak || Spacewatch || V || align=right data-sort-value="0.80" | 800 m || 
|-id=846 bgcolor=#fefefe
| 330846 ||  || — || August 14, 2009 || La Sagra || OAM Obs. || V || align=right data-sort-value="0.84" | 840 m || 
|-id=847 bgcolor=#fefefe
| 330847 ||  || — || August 15, 2009 || La Sagra || OAM Obs. || — || align=right | 1.1 km || 
|-id=848 bgcolor=#FA8072
| 330848 ||  || — || August 15, 2009 || Grove Creek || F. Tozzi || — || align=right data-sort-value="0.96" | 960 m || 
|-id=849 bgcolor=#fefefe
| 330849 ||  || — || August 15, 2009 || Catalina || CSS || NYS || align=right data-sort-value="0.75" | 750 m || 
|-id=850 bgcolor=#fefefe
| 330850 ||  || — || August 15, 2009 || Catalina || CSS || NYS || align=right data-sort-value="0.87" | 870 m || 
|-id=851 bgcolor=#d6d6d6
| 330851 ||  || — || February 3, 2001 || Kitt Peak || Spacewatch || — || align=right | 3.2 km || 
|-id=852 bgcolor=#d6d6d6
| 330852 ||  || — || August 15, 2009 || Catalina || CSS || — || align=right | 3.1 km || 
|-id=853 bgcolor=#E9E9E9
| 330853 ||  || — || August 15, 2009 || Kitt Peak || Spacewatch || — || align=right | 2.4 km || 
|-id=854 bgcolor=#fefefe
| 330854 ||  || — || August 15, 2009 || Kitt Peak || Spacewatch || FLO || align=right data-sort-value="0.66" | 660 m || 
|-id=855 bgcolor=#fefefe
| 330855 ||  || — || August 16, 2009 || Črni Vrh || Črni Vrh || — || align=right data-sort-value="0.81" | 810 m || 
|-id=856 bgcolor=#fefefe
| 330856 Ernsthelene ||  ||  || August 20, 2009 || Taunus || R. Kling, U. Zimmer || V || align=right data-sort-value="0.74" | 740 m || 
|-id=857 bgcolor=#fefefe
| 330857 ||  || — || August 18, 2009 || Kitt Peak || Spacewatch || — || align=right data-sort-value="0.98" | 980 m || 
|-id=858 bgcolor=#fefefe
| 330858 ||  || — || August 16, 2009 || La Sagra || OAM Obs. || — || align=right | 1.1 km || 
|-id=859 bgcolor=#E9E9E9
| 330859 ||  || — || August 23, 2009 || Bergisch Gladbac || W. Bickel || — || align=right | 1.8 km || 
|-id=860 bgcolor=#fefefe
| 330860 ||  || — || August 21, 2009 || Socorro || LINEAR || — || align=right | 1.5 km || 
|-id=861 bgcolor=#fefefe
| 330861 ||  || — || August 20, 2009 || Kitt Peak || Spacewatch || EUT || align=right data-sort-value="0.84" | 840 m || 
|-id=862 bgcolor=#fefefe
| 330862 ||  || — || October 2, 2003 || Kitt Peak || Spacewatch || — || align=right data-sort-value="0.77" | 770 m || 
|-id=863 bgcolor=#fefefe
| 330863 ||  || — || August 18, 2009 || Kitt Peak || Spacewatch || — || align=right data-sort-value="0.86" | 860 m || 
|-id=864 bgcolor=#d6d6d6
| 330864 ||  || — || October 16, 2004 || Socorro || LINEAR || — || align=right | 4.3 km || 
|-id=865 bgcolor=#d6d6d6
| 330865 ||  || — || April 14, 2008 || Mount Lemmon || Mount Lemmon Survey || — || align=right | 3.2 km || 
|-id=866 bgcolor=#fefefe
| 330866 ||  || — || August 28, 2009 || La Sagra || OAM Obs. || — || align=right data-sort-value="0.61" | 610 m || 
|-id=867 bgcolor=#fefefe
| 330867 ||  || — || August 28, 2009 || La Sagra || OAM Obs. || — || align=right | 1.1 km || 
|-id=868 bgcolor=#fefefe
| 330868 ||  || — || August 28, 2009 || Kitt Peak || Spacewatch || — || align=right data-sort-value="0.81" | 810 m || 
|-id=869 bgcolor=#fefefe
| 330869 ||  || — || August 28, 2009 || Kitt Peak || Spacewatch || MAS || align=right data-sort-value="0.73" | 730 m || 
|-id=870 bgcolor=#fefefe
| 330870 ||  || — || August 27, 2009 || Kitt Peak || Spacewatch || MAS || align=right data-sort-value="0.93" | 930 m || 
|-id=871 bgcolor=#fefefe
| 330871 || 2009 RF || — || September 9, 2009 || Bisei SG Center || BATTeRS || MAS || align=right data-sort-value="0.86" | 860 m || 
|-id=872 bgcolor=#fefefe
| 330872 ||  || — || September 10, 2009 || La Sagra || OAM Obs. || — || align=right | 1.3 km || 
|-id=873 bgcolor=#fefefe
| 330873 ||  || — || September 10, 2009 || ESA OGS || ESA OGS || NYS || align=right data-sort-value="0.81" | 810 m || 
|-id=874 bgcolor=#fefefe
| 330874 ||  || — || September 12, 2009 || Kitt Peak || Spacewatch || NYS || align=right data-sort-value="0.70" | 700 m || 
|-id=875 bgcolor=#d6d6d6
| 330875 ||  || — || March 13, 2007 || Mount Lemmon || Mount Lemmon Survey || — || align=right | 2.6 km || 
|-id=876 bgcolor=#E9E9E9
| 330876 ||  || — || September 12, 2009 || Kitt Peak || Spacewatch || — || align=right | 1.7 km || 
|-id=877 bgcolor=#E9E9E9
| 330877 ||  || — || September 15, 2009 || Kitt Peak || Spacewatch || — || align=right | 1.0 km || 
|-id=878 bgcolor=#fefefe
| 330878 ||  || — || September 13, 2009 || Socorro || LINEAR || — || align=right data-sort-value="0.96" | 960 m || 
|-id=879 bgcolor=#fefefe
| 330879 ||  || — || September 14, 2009 || La Sagra || OAM Obs. || — || align=right data-sort-value="0.87" | 870 m || 
|-id=880 bgcolor=#fefefe
| 330880 ||  || — || September 14, 2009 || Kitt Peak || Spacewatch || FLO || align=right data-sort-value="0.73" | 730 m || 
|-id=881 bgcolor=#E9E9E9
| 330881 ||  || — || September 14, 2009 || Kitt Peak || Spacewatch || — || align=right | 2.0 km || 
|-id=882 bgcolor=#E9E9E9
| 330882 ||  || — || September 14, 2009 || Kitt Peak || Spacewatch || — || align=right | 2.5 km || 
|-id=883 bgcolor=#E9E9E9
| 330883 ||  || — || September 14, 2009 || Kitt Peak || Spacewatch || KON || align=right | 4.2 km || 
|-id=884 bgcolor=#E9E9E9
| 330884 ||  || — || September 15, 2009 || Kitt Peak || Spacewatch || — || align=right | 1.9 km || 
|-id=885 bgcolor=#E9E9E9
| 330885 ||  || — || September 15, 2009 || Kitt Peak || Spacewatch || — || align=right | 2.1 km || 
|-id=886 bgcolor=#d6d6d6
| 330886 ||  || — || September 15, 2009 || Kitt Peak || Spacewatch || — || align=right | 2.0 km || 
|-id=887 bgcolor=#E9E9E9
| 330887 ||  || — || September 15, 2009 || Kitt Peak || Spacewatch || — || align=right | 3.5 km || 
|-id=888 bgcolor=#E9E9E9
| 330888 ||  || — || September 15, 2009 || Kitt Peak || Spacewatch || — || align=right | 1.5 km || 
|-id=889 bgcolor=#E9E9E9
| 330889 ||  || — || September 15, 2009 || Kitt Peak || Spacewatch || — || align=right | 3.1 km || 
|-id=890 bgcolor=#E9E9E9
| 330890 ||  || — || September 12, 2009 || La Sagra || OAM Obs. || — || align=right | 1.2 km || 
|-id=891 bgcolor=#fefefe
| 330891 ||  || — || September 15, 2009 || Kitt Peak || Spacewatch || MAS || align=right data-sort-value="0.66" | 660 m || 
|-id=892 bgcolor=#d6d6d6
| 330892 ||  || — || September 15, 2009 || Kitt Peak || Spacewatch || — || align=right | 2.0 km || 
|-id=893 bgcolor=#fefefe
| 330893 ||  || — || September 16, 2009 || Mount Lemmon || Mount Lemmon Survey || V || align=right data-sort-value="0.72" | 720 m || 
|-id=894 bgcolor=#E9E9E9
| 330894 ||  || — || September 17, 2009 || Catalina || CSS || — || align=right | 3.1 km || 
|-id=895 bgcolor=#E9E9E9
| 330895 ||  || — || September 21, 2009 || La Silla || La Silla Obs. || — || align=right | 1.5 km || 
|-id=896 bgcolor=#fefefe
| 330896 ||  || — || September 16, 2009 || Kitt Peak || Spacewatch || FLO || align=right data-sort-value="0.69" | 690 m || 
|-id=897 bgcolor=#fefefe
| 330897 ||  || — || September 16, 2009 || Kitt Peak || Spacewatch || — || align=right data-sort-value="0.90" | 900 m || 
|-id=898 bgcolor=#E9E9E9
| 330898 ||  || — || September 16, 2009 || Kitt Peak || Spacewatch || — || align=right | 1.7 km || 
|-id=899 bgcolor=#E9E9E9
| 330899 ||  || — || September 16, 2009 || Kitt Peak || Spacewatch || — || align=right | 2.6 km || 
|-id=900 bgcolor=#E9E9E9
| 330900 ||  || — || January 14, 2002 || Kitt Peak || Spacewatch || HOF || align=right | 2.4 km || 
|}

330901–331000 

|-bgcolor=#E9E9E9
| 330901 ||  || — || September 17, 2009 || Catalina || CSS || — || align=right | 3.1 km || 
|-id=902 bgcolor=#fefefe
| 330902 ||  || — || September 17, 2009 || Kitt Peak || Spacewatch || V || align=right data-sort-value="0.78" | 780 m || 
|-id=903 bgcolor=#E9E9E9
| 330903 ||  || — || September 17, 2009 || Kitt Peak || Spacewatch || — || align=right | 1.8 km || 
|-id=904 bgcolor=#E9E9E9
| 330904 ||  || — || September 17, 2009 || Kitt Peak || Spacewatch || AGN || align=right | 1.2 km || 
|-id=905 bgcolor=#d6d6d6
| 330905 ||  || — || September 17, 2009 || Kitt Peak || Spacewatch || — || align=right | 3.6 km || 
|-id=906 bgcolor=#fefefe
| 330906 ||  || — || September 17, 2009 || Kitt Peak || Spacewatch || — || align=right data-sort-value="0.85" | 850 m || 
|-id=907 bgcolor=#d6d6d6
| 330907 ||  || — || September 17, 2009 || Kitt Peak || Spacewatch || — || align=right | 2.6 km || 
|-id=908 bgcolor=#E9E9E9
| 330908 ||  || — || September 17, 2009 || Kitt Peak || Spacewatch || AGN || align=right | 1.3 km || 
|-id=909 bgcolor=#E9E9E9
| 330909 ||  || — || September 17, 2009 || Kitt Peak || Spacewatch || — || align=right | 1.2 km || 
|-id=910 bgcolor=#d6d6d6
| 330910 ||  || — || February 4, 2006 || Kitt Peak || Spacewatch || HYG || align=right | 2.9 km || 
|-id=911 bgcolor=#E9E9E9
| 330911 ||  || — || September 18, 2009 || Kitt Peak || Spacewatch || — || align=right | 2.1 km || 
|-id=912 bgcolor=#d6d6d6
| 330912 ||  || — || September 18, 2009 || Mount Lemmon || Mount Lemmon Survey || EOS || align=right | 2.1 km || 
|-id=913 bgcolor=#d6d6d6
| 330913 ||  || — || September 18, 2009 || Purple Mountain || PMO NEO || — || align=right | 3.0 km || 
|-id=914 bgcolor=#d6d6d6
| 330914 ||  || — || September 19, 2009 || Mount Lemmon || Mount Lemmon Survey || — || align=right | 3.1 km || 
|-id=915 bgcolor=#E9E9E9
| 330915 ||  || — || September 20, 2009 || Socorro || LINEAR || — || align=right | 3.2 km || 
|-id=916 bgcolor=#E9E9E9
| 330916 ||  || — || September 23, 2009 || Taunus || S. Karge, R. Kling || — || align=right | 2.3 km || 
|-id=917 bgcolor=#E9E9E9
| 330917 ||  || — || September 26, 2009 || La Sagra || OAM Obs. || EUN || align=right | 2.4 km || 
|-id=918 bgcolor=#d6d6d6
| 330918 ||  || — || September 16, 2009 || Mount Lemmon || Mount Lemmon Survey || — || align=right | 5.5 km || 
|-id=919 bgcolor=#d6d6d6
| 330919 ||  || — || September 16, 2009 || Mount Lemmon || Mount Lemmon Survey || — || align=right | 4.3 km || 
|-id=920 bgcolor=#E9E9E9
| 330920 ||  || — || September 18, 2009 || Kitt Peak || Spacewatch || — || align=right | 2.3 km || 
|-id=921 bgcolor=#fefefe
| 330921 ||  || — || September 18, 2009 || Kitt Peak || Spacewatch || NYS || align=right data-sort-value="0.70" | 700 m || 
|-id=922 bgcolor=#E9E9E9
| 330922 ||  || — || September 18, 2009 || Kitt Peak || Spacewatch || — || align=right | 1.4 km || 
|-id=923 bgcolor=#E9E9E9
| 330923 ||  || — || September 18, 2009 || Kitt Peak || Spacewatch || — || align=right | 2.4 km || 
|-id=924 bgcolor=#E9E9E9
| 330924 ||  || — || September 20, 2009 || Kitt Peak || Spacewatch || — || align=right | 2.1 km || 
|-id=925 bgcolor=#fefefe
| 330925 ||  || — || September 21, 2009 || Catalina || CSS || FLO || align=right data-sort-value="0.73" | 730 m || 
|-id=926 bgcolor=#E9E9E9
| 330926 ||  || — || October 25, 2005 || Kitt Peak || Spacewatch || — || align=right | 2.0 km || 
|-id=927 bgcolor=#d6d6d6
| 330927 ||  || — || March 14, 2007 || Mount Lemmon || Mount Lemmon Survey || — || align=right | 3.9 km || 
|-id=928 bgcolor=#E9E9E9
| 330928 ||  || — || September 21, 2009 || Kitt Peak || Spacewatch || — || align=right | 2.0 km || 
|-id=929 bgcolor=#fefefe
| 330929 ||  || — || September 22, 2009 || Kitt Peak || Spacewatch || V || align=right data-sort-value="0.69" | 690 m || 
|-id=930 bgcolor=#E9E9E9
| 330930 ||  || — || September 22, 2009 || Kitt Peak || Spacewatch || AST || align=right | 1.8 km || 
|-id=931 bgcolor=#fefefe
| 330931 ||  || — || September 22, 2009 || Kitt Peak || Spacewatch || NYS || align=right data-sort-value="0.62" | 620 m || 
|-id=932 bgcolor=#fefefe
| 330932 ||  || — || September 23, 2009 || Kitt Peak || Spacewatch || — || align=right | 1.2 km || 
|-id=933 bgcolor=#fefefe
| 330933 ||  || — || September 23, 2009 || Kitt Peak || Spacewatch || MAS || align=right data-sort-value="0.72" | 720 m || 
|-id=934 bgcolor=#E9E9E9
| 330934 Natevanwey ||  ||  || September 26, 2009 || LightBuckets || S. Cullen || — || align=right | 1.4 km || 
|-id=935 bgcolor=#E9E9E9
| 330935 ||  || — || September 16, 2009 || Kitt Peak || Spacewatch || — || align=right | 2.1 km || 
|-id=936 bgcolor=#E9E9E9
| 330936 ||  || — || September 16, 2009 || Mount Lemmon || Mount Lemmon Survey || — || align=right | 1.6 km || 
|-id=937 bgcolor=#E9E9E9
| 330937 ||  || — || September 19, 2009 || Kitt Peak || Spacewatch || — || align=right | 2.9 km || 
|-id=938 bgcolor=#fefefe
| 330938 ||  || — || September 21, 2009 || Catalina || CSS || — || align=right data-sort-value="0.93" | 930 m || 
|-id=939 bgcolor=#E9E9E9
| 330939 ||  || — || September 16, 2009 || Catalina || CSS || — || align=right | 2.2 km || 
|-id=940 bgcolor=#fefefe
| 330940 ||  || — || September 16, 2009 || Catalina || CSS || — || align=right | 1.2 km || 
|-id=941 bgcolor=#E9E9E9
| 330941 ||  || — || September 16, 2009 || Catalina || CSS || — || align=right | 1.8 km || 
|-id=942 bgcolor=#E9E9E9
| 330942 ||  || — || September 17, 2009 || Kitt Peak || Spacewatch || — || align=right | 1.5 km || 
|-id=943 bgcolor=#d6d6d6
| 330943 ||  || — || September 23, 2009 || Mount Lemmon || Mount Lemmon Survey || — || align=right | 4.7 km || 
|-id=944 bgcolor=#d6d6d6
| 330944 ||  || — || September 25, 2009 || Kitt Peak || Spacewatch || THM || align=right | 2.4 km || 
|-id=945 bgcolor=#fefefe
| 330945 ||  || — || September 25, 2009 || Kitt Peak || Spacewatch || — || align=right | 1.0 km || 
|-id=946 bgcolor=#E9E9E9
| 330946 ||  || — || September 25, 2009 || Kitt Peak || Spacewatch || — || align=right | 1.2 km || 
|-id=947 bgcolor=#fefefe
| 330947 ||  || — || September 25, 2009 || Kitt Peak || Spacewatch || V || align=right data-sort-value="0.79" | 790 m || 
|-id=948 bgcolor=#d6d6d6
| 330948 ||  || — || September 25, 2009 || Kitt Peak || Spacewatch || — || align=right | 3.4 km || 
|-id=949 bgcolor=#d6d6d6
| 330949 ||  || — || September 17, 2009 || Kitt Peak || Spacewatch || — || align=right | 3.1 km || 
|-id=950 bgcolor=#E9E9E9
| 330950 ||  || — || September 26, 2009 || Kitt Peak || Spacewatch || — || align=right | 1.4 km || 
|-id=951 bgcolor=#E9E9E9
| 330951 ||  || — || September 26, 2009 || Kitt Peak || Spacewatch || — || align=right | 1.7 km || 
|-id=952 bgcolor=#fefefe
| 330952 ||  || — || September 17, 2009 || Kitt Peak || Spacewatch || NYS || align=right data-sort-value="0.66" | 660 m || 
|-id=953 bgcolor=#E9E9E9
| 330953 ||  || — || September 16, 2009 || Catalina || CSS || — || align=right | 1.7 km || 
|-id=954 bgcolor=#fefefe
| 330954 ||  || — || September 17, 2009 || Kitt Peak || Spacewatch || — || align=right | 1.1 km || 
|-id=955 bgcolor=#E9E9E9
| 330955 ||  || — || September 21, 2009 || Kitt Peak || Spacewatch || — || align=right | 2.5 km || 
|-id=956 bgcolor=#d6d6d6
| 330956 ||  || — || September 22, 2009 || Mount Lemmon || Mount Lemmon Survey || — || align=right | 3.3 km || 
|-id=957 bgcolor=#d6d6d6
| 330957 ||  || — || September 18, 2009 || Kitt Peak || Spacewatch || KOR || align=right | 1.1 km || 
|-id=958 bgcolor=#E9E9E9
| 330958 ||  || — || September 25, 2009 || Kitt Peak || Spacewatch || RAF || align=right data-sort-value="0.90" | 900 m || 
|-id=959 bgcolor=#E9E9E9
| 330959 ||  || — || September 17, 2009 || Kitt Peak || Spacewatch || — || align=right | 1.4 km || 
|-id=960 bgcolor=#E9E9E9
| 330960 ||  || — || September 18, 2009 || Kitt Peak || Spacewatch || HEN || align=right | 1.0 km || 
|-id=961 bgcolor=#E9E9E9
| 330961 ||  || — || September 18, 2009 || Kitt Peak || Spacewatch || NEM || align=right | 1.9 km || 
|-id=962 bgcolor=#E9E9E9
| 330962 ||  || — || September 19, 2009 || Kitt Peak || Spacewatch || — || align=right | 1.4 km || 
|-id=963 bgcolor=#E9E9E9
| 330963 ||  || — || September 20, 2009 || Kitt Peak || Spacewatch || MAR || align=right data-sort-value="0.81" | 810 m || 
|-id=964 bgcolor=#E9E9E9
| 330964 ||  || — || September 23, 2009 || Mount Lemmon || Mount Lemmon Survey || — || align=right | 1.1 km || 
|-id=965 bgcolor=#d6d6d6
| 330965 ||  || — || September 28, 2009 || Mount Lemmon || Mount Lemmon Survey || 615 || align=right | 1.9 km || 
|-id=966 bgcolor=#E9E9E9
| 330966 ||  || — || September 20, 2009 || Mount Lemmon || Mount Lemmon Survey || — || align=right | 2.1 km || 
|-id=967 bgcolor=#E9E9E9
| 330967 ||  || — || September 17, 2009 || Kitt Peak || Spacewatch || — || align=right | 2.9 km || 
|-id=968 bgcolor=#E9E9E9
| 330968 ||  || — || September 22, 2009 || Mount Lemmon || Mount Lemmon Survey || — || align=right | 1.4 km || 
|-id=969 bgcolor=#E9E9E9
| 330969 ||  || — || September 22, 2009 || Kitt Peak || Spacewatch || — || align=right | 2.5 km || 
|-id=970 bgcolor=#E9E9E9
| 330970 ||  || — || September 24, 2009 || Catalina || CSS || EUN || align=right | 1.3 km || 
|-id=971 bgcolor=#E9E9E9
| 330971 ||  || — || September 18, 2009 || Mount Lemmon || Mount Lemmon Survey || — || align=right | 2.4 km || 
|-id=972 bgcolor=#fefefe
| 330972 ||  || — || October 10, 2009 || Bisei SG Center || BATTeRS || MAS || align=right data-sort-value="0.74" | 740 m || 
|-id=973 bgcolor=#d6d6d6
| 330973 ||  || — || October 10, 2009 || Bisei SG Center || BATTeRS || — || align=right | 3.2 km || 
|-id=974 bgcolor=#fefefe
| 330974 ||  || — || October 8, 2009 || La Sagra || OAM Obs. || — || align=right data-sort-value="0.99" | 990 m || 
|-id=975 bgcolor=#d6d6d6
| 330975 ||  || — || August 1, 2009 || Kitt Peak || Spacewatch || — || align=right | 4.8 km || 
|-id=976 bgcolor=#E9E9E9
| 330976 ||  || — || October 11, 2009 || La Sagra || OAM Obs. || — || align=right | 2.3 km || 
|-id=977 bgcolor=#d6d6d6
| 330977 ||  || — || October 14, 2009 || Bergisch Gladbac || W. Bickel || — || align=right | 3.3 km || 
|-id=978 bgcolor=#E9E9E9
| 330978 ||  || — || October 13, 2009 || Weihai || Shandong University Obs. || — || align=right | 1.9 km || 
|-id=979 bgcolor=#d6d6d6
| 330979 ||  || — || October 1, 2009 || Mount Lemmon || Mount Lemmon Survey || — || align=right | 3.9 km || 
|-id=980 bgcolor=#E9E9E9
| 330980 ||  || — || December 5, 2005 || Kitt Peak || Spacewatch || PAD || align=right | 2.0 km || 
|-id=981 bgcolor=#E9E9E9
| 330981 ||  || — || October 14, 2009 || La Sagra || OAM Obs. || — || align=right | 3.0 km || 
|-id=982 bgcolor=#E9E9E9
| 330982 ||  || — || October 14, 2009 || La Sagra || OAM Obs. || — || align=right | 2.3 km || 
|-id=983 bgcolor=#fefefe
| 330983 ||  || — || October 14, 2009 || Catalina || CSS || NYS || align=right data-sort-value="0.74" | 740 m || 
|-id=984 bgcolor=#E9E9E9
| 330984 ||  || — || October 14, 2009 || Catalina || CSS || — || align=right | 2.3 km || 
|-id=985 bgcolor=#E9E9E9
| 330985 ||  || — || October 12, 2009 || Mount Lemmon || Mount Lemmon Survey || — || align=right | 2.9 km || 
|-id=986 bgcolor=#E9E9E9
| 330986 ||  || — || October 1, 2009 || Mount Lemmon || Mount Lemmon Survey || NEM || align=right | 2.5 km || 
|-id=987 bgcolor=#E9E9E9
| 330987 ||  || — || September 17, 2009 || Kitt Peak || Spacewatch || HOF || align=right | 2.0 km || 
|-id=988 bgcolor=#d6d6d6
| 330988 ||  || — || October 17, 2009 || Mount Lemmon || Mount Lemmon Survey || — || align=right | 3.2 km || 
|-id=989 bgcolor=#d6d6d6
| 330989 ||  || — || October 18, 2009 || Mount Lemmon || Mount Lemmon Survey || HYG || align=right | 3.3 km || 
|-id=990 bgcolor=#E9E9E9
| 330990 ||  || — || October 18, 2009 || Mount Lemmon || Mount Lemmon Survey || — || align=right | 2.9 km || 
|-id=991 bgcolor=#E9E9E9
| 330991 ||  || — || October 21, 2009 || Catalina || CSS || — || align=right | 2.8 km || 
|-id=992 bgcolor=#E9E9E9
| 330992 ||  || — || October 21, 2009 || Catalina || CSS || — || align=right | 3.8 km || 
|-id=993 bgcolor=#E9E9E9
| 330993 ||  || — || October 22, 2009 || Mount Lemmon || Mount Lemmon Survey || — || align=right | 2.1 km || 
|-id=994 bgcolor=#E9E9E9
| 330994 ||  || — || October 22, 2009 || Catalina || CSS || — || align=right | 1.9 km || 
|-id=995 bgcolor=#d6d6d6
| 330995 ||  || — || September 18, 2009 || Mount Lemmon || Mount Lemmon Survey || — || align=right | 4.1 km || 
|-id=996 bgcolor=#E9E9E9
| 330996 ||  || — || October 18, 2009 || Mount Lemmon || Mount Lemmon Survey || — || align=right | 2.1 km || 
|-id=997 bgcolor=#E9E9E9
| 330997 ||  || — || October 21, 2009 || Mount Lemmon || Mount Lemmon Survey || — || align=right | 1.5 km || 
|-id=998 bgcolor=#E9E9E9
| 330998 ||  || — || October 22, 2009 || Mount Lemmon || Mount Lemmon Survey || — || align=right | 1.00 km || 
|-id=999 bgcolor=#E9E9E9
| 330999 ||  || — || October 18, 2009 || Mount Lemmon || Mount Lemmon Survey || — || align=right | 2.3 km || 
|-id=000 bgcolor=#d6d6d6
| 331000 ||  || — || October 18, 2009 || Mount Lemmon || Mount Lemmon Survey || EOS || align=right | 2.7 km || 
|}

References

External links 
 Discovery Circumstances: Numbered Minor Planets (330001)–(335000) (IAU Minor Planet Center)

0330